

308001–308100 

|-bgcolor=#fefefe
| 308001 ||  || — || September 8, 2004 || Socorro || LINEAR || — || align=right data-sort-value="0.76" | 760 m || 
|-id=002 bgcolor=#fefefe
| 308002 ||  || — || September 8, 2004 || Palomar || NEAT || — || align=right | 1.0 km || 
|-id=003 bgcolor=#fefefe
| 308003 ||  || — || September 9, 2004 || Kitt Peak || Spacewatch || FLO || align=right data-sort-value="0.64" | 640 m || 
|-id=004 bgcolor=#FA8072
| 308004 ||  || — || September 11, 2004 || Socorro || LINEAR || — || align=right | 1.8 km || 
|-id=005 bgcolor=#E9E9E9
| 308005 ||  || — || September 7, 2004 || Kitt Peak || Spacewatch || — || align=right | 2.1 km || 
|-id=006 bgcolor=#d6d6d6
| 308006 ||  || — || September 8, 2004 || Socorro || LINEAR || MEL || align=right | 4.7 km || 
|-id=007 bgcolor=#fefefe
| 308007 ||  || — || September 8, 2004 || Palomar || NEAT || — || align=right data-sort-value="0.94" | 940 m || 
|-id=008 bgcolor=#fefefe
| 308008 ||  || — || September 9, 2004 || Socorro || LINEAR || — || align=right data-sort-value="0.91" | 910 m || 
|-id=009 bgcolor=#fefefe
| 308009 ||  || — || September 10, 2004 || Socorro || LINEAR || — || align=right | 1.6 km || 
|-id=010 bgcolor=#E9E9E9
| 308010 ||  || — || September 10, 2004 || Socorro || LINEAR || — || align=right | 1.4 km || 
|-id=011 bgcolor=#fefefe
| 308011 ||  || — || September 10, 2004 || Socorro || LINEAR || — || align=right | 1.0 km || 
|-id=012 bgcolor=#d6d6d6
| 308012 ||  || — || September 10, 2004 || Socorro || LINEAR || — || align=right | 5.1 km || 
|-id=013 bgcolor=#d6d6d6
| 308013 ||  || — || September 10, 2004 || Socorro || LINEAR || — || align=right | 3.9 km || 
|-id=014 bgcolor=#FA8072
| 308014 ||  || — || September 10, 2004 || Socorro || LINEAR || — || align=right data-sort-value="0.83" | 830 m || 
|-id=015 bgcolor=#d6d6d6
| 308015 ||  || — || September 11, 2004 || Socorro || LINEAR || — || align=right | 5.6 km || 
|-id=016 bgcolor=#E9E9E9
| 308016 ||  || — || September 11, 2004 || Socorro || LINEAR || — || align=right | 1.7 km || 
|-id=017 bgcolor=#E9E9E9
| 308017 ||  || — || September 11, 2004 || Socorro || LINEAR || EUN || align=right | 1.9 km || 
|-id=018 bgcolor=#E9E9E9
| 308018 ||  || — || September 11, 2004 || Socorro || LINEAR || — || align=right | 2.0 km || 
|-id=019 bgcolor=#E9E9E9
| 308019 ||  || — || September 11, 2004 || Socorro || LINEAR || — || align=right | 2.6 km || 
|-id=020 bgcolor=#FA8072
| 308020 ||  || — || September 13, 2004 || Socorro || LINEAR || — || align=right | 4.9 km || 
|-id=021 bgcolor=#fefefe
| 308021 ||  || — || September 9, 2004 || Socorro || LINEAR || — || align=right | 1.2 km || 
|-id=022 bgcolor=#fefefe
| 308022 ||  || — || September 9, 2004 || Kitt Peak || Spacewatch || — || align=right | 1.0 km || 
|-id=023 bgcolor=#fefefe
| 308023 ||  || — || September 6, 2004 || Palomar || NEAT || FLO || align=right data-sort-value="0.62" | 620 m || 
|-id=024 bgcolor=#fefefe
| 308024 ||  || — || September 6, 2004 || Palomar || NEAT || H || align=right data-sort-value="0.82" | 820 m || 
|-id=025 bgcolor=#E9E9E9
| 308025 ||  || — || September 11, 2004 || Kitt Peak || Spacewatch || — || align=right | 1.0 km || 
|-id=026 bgcolor=#fefefe
| 308026 ||  || — || September 15, 2004 || Kitt Peak || Spacewatch || — || align=right data-sort-value="0.97" | 970 m || 
|-id=027 bgcolor=#fefefe
| 308027 ||  || — || September 13, 2004 || Socorro || LINEAR || FLO || align=right data-sort-value="0.83" | 830 m || 
|-id=028 bgcolor=#fefefe
| 308028 ||  || — || September 15, 2004 || Kitt Peak || Spacewatch || NYS || align=right data-sort-value="0.86" | 860 m || 
|-id=029 bgcolor=#E9E9E9
| 308029 ||  || — || September 10, 2004 || Socorro || LINEAR || — || align=right | 3.8 km || 
|-id=030 bgcolor=#fefefe
| 308030 ||  || — || September 17, 2004 || Kitt Peak || Spacewatch || — || align=right data-sort-value="0.86" | 860 m || 
|-id=031 bgcolor=#fefefe
| 308031 ||  || — || September 19, 2004 || CBA-NOVAC || D. R. Skillman || — || align=right data-sort-value="0.75" | 750 m || 
|-id=032 bgcolor=#E9E9E9
| 308032 ||  || — || September 16, 2004 || Siding Spring || SSS || — || align=right | 1.5 km || 
|-id=033 bgcolor=#fefefe
| 308033 ||  || — || September 17, 2004 || Socorro || LINEAR || FLO || align=right data-sort-value="0.65" | 650 m || 
|-id=034 bgcolor=#d6d6d6
| 308034 ||  || — || September 17, 2004 || Socorro || LINEAR || — || align=right | 4.3 km || 
|-id=035 bgcolor=#d6d6d6
| 308035 ||  || — || September 17, 2004 || Socorro || LINEAR || — || align=right | 4.5 km || 
|-id=036 bgcolor=#fefefe
| 308036 ||  || — || September 17, 2004 || Socorro || LINEAR || FLO || align=right data-sort-value="0.83" | 830 m || 
|-id=037 bgcolor=#d6d6d6
| 308037 ||  || — || September 17, 2004 || Socorro || LINEAR || 629 || align=right | 2.9 km || 
|-id=038 bgcolor=#fefefe
| 308038 ||  || — || September 18, 2004 || Socorro || LINEAR || FLO || align=right data-sort-value="0.82" | 820 m || 
|-id=039 bgcolor=#fefefe
| 308039 ||  || — || September 18, 2004 || Socorro || LINEAR || FLO || align=right data-sort-value="0.60" | 600 m || 
|-id=040 bgcolor=#E9E9E9
| 308040 ||  || — || September 18, 2004 || Socorro || LINEAR || — || align=right | 2.2 km || 
|-id=041 bgcolor=#FFC2E0
| 308041 ||  || — || October 4, 2004 || Kitt Peak || Spacewatch || APO || align=right data-sort-value="0.57" | 570 m || 
|-id=042 bgcolor=#FA8072
| 308042 ||  || — || October 5, 2004 || Anderson Mesa || LONEOS || H || align=right data-sort-value="0.93" | 930 m || 
|-id=043 bgcolor=#FFC2E0
| 308043 ||  || — || October 8, 2004 || Socorro || LINEAR || APO || align=right data-sort-value="0.70" | 700 m || 
|-id=044 bgcolor=#fefefe
| 308044 ||  || — || October 10, 2004 || Socorro || LINEAR || — || align=right data-sort-value="0.81" | 810 m || 
|-id=045 bgcolor=#d6d6d6
| 308045 ||  || — || October 6, 2004 || Palomar || NEAT || CHA || align=right | 3.1 km || 
|-id=046 bgcolor=#fefefe
| 308046 ||  || — || October 12, 2004 || Moletai || K. Černis, J. Zdanavičius || V || align=right data-sort-value="0.71" | 710 m || 
|-id=047 bgcolor=#fefefe
| 308047 ||  || — || October 4, 2004 || Kitt Peak || Spacewatch || — || align=right data-sort-value="0.77" | 770 m || 
|-id=048 bgcolor=#fefefe
| 308048 ||  || — || October 4, 2004 || Kitt Peak || Spacewatch || — || align=right data-sort-value="0.86" | 860 m || 
|-id=049 bgcolor=#fefefe
| 308049 ||  || — || October 4, 2004 || Kitt Peak || Spacewatch || NYS || align=right data-sort-value="0.75" | 750 m || 
|-id=050 bgcolor=#fefefe
| 308050 ||  || — || October 4, 2004 || Kitt Peak || Spacewatch || — || align=right data-sort-value="0.79" | 790 m || 
|-id=051 bgcolor=#fefefe
| 308051 ||  || — || October 4, 2004 || Kitt Peak || Spacewatch || — || align=right data-sort-value="0.85" | 850 m || 
|-id=052 bgcolor=#fefefe
| 308052 ||  || — || October 4, 2004 || Kitt Peak || Spacewatch || V || align=right data-sort-value="0.75" | 750 m || 
|-id=053 bgcolor=#fefefe
| 308053 ||  || — || October 4, 2004 || Kitt Peak || Spacewatch || — || align=right data-sort-value="0.76" | 760 m || 
|-id=054 bgcolor=#fefefe
| 308054 ||  || — || October 5, 2004 || Kitt Peak || Spacewatch || V || align=right data-sort-value="0.68" | 680 m || 
|-id=055 bgcolor=#fefefe
| 308055 ||  || — || October 5, 2004 || Anderson Mesa || LONEOS || — || align=right data-sort-value="0.86" | 860 m || 
|-id=056 bgcolor=#fefefe
| 308056 ||  || — || October 5, 2004 || Kitt Peak || Spacewatch || FLO || align=right data-sort-value="0.74" | 740 m || 
|-id=057 bgcolor=#fefefe
| 308057 ||  || — || October 6, 2004 || Kitt Peak || Spacewatch || — || align=right data-sort-value="0.98" | 980 m || 
|-id=058 bgcolor=#fefefe
| 308058 ||  || — || October 4, 2004 || Anderson Mesa || LONEOS || — || align=right | 1.3 km || 
|-id=059 bgcolor=#fefefe
| 308059 ||  || — || October 6, 2004 || Palomar || NEAT || — || align=right data-sort-value="0.87" | 870 m || 
|-id=060 bgcolor=#fefefe
| 308060 ||  || — || August 15, 2004 || Siding Spring || SSS || — || align=right data-sort-value="0.79" | 790 m || 
|-id=061 bgcolor=#d6d6d6
| 308061 ||  || — || October 6, 2004 || Kitt Peak || Spacewatch || — || align=right | 4.2 km || 
|-id=062 bgcolor=#fefefe
| 308062 ||  || — || October 6, 2004 || Kitt Peak || Spacewatch || — || align=right | 1.2 km || 
|-id=063 bgcolor=#fefefe
| 308063 ||  || — || October 6, 2004 || Kitt Peak || Spacewatch || — || align=right data-sort-value="0.98" | 980 m || 
|-id=064 bgcolor=#fefefe
| 308064 ||  || — || October 6, 2004 || Kitt Peak || Spacewatch || — || align=right | 1.0 km || 
|-id=065 bgcolor=#fefefe
| 308065 ||  || — || October 6, 2004 || Kitt Peak || Spacewatch || FLO || align=right data-sort-value="0.87" | 870 m || 
|-id=066 bgcolor=#fefefe
| 308066 ||  || — || October 6, 2004 || Kitt Peak || Spacewatch || NYS || align=right data-sort-value="0.72" | 720 m || 
|-id=067 bgcolor=#d6d6d6
| 308067 ||  || — || October 8, 2004 || Socorro || LINEAR || TRE || align=right | 4.8 km || 
|-id=068 bgcolor=#fefefe
| 308068 ||  || — || October 7, 2004 || Kitt Peak || Spacewatch || — || align=right | 1.2 km || 
|-id=069 bgcolor=#fefefe
| 308069 ||  || — || October 7, 2004 || Kitt Peak || Spacewatch || FLO || align=right data-sort-value="0.73" | 730 m || 
|-id=070 bgcolor=#d6d6d6
| 308070 ||  || — || October 7, 2004 || Kitt Peak || Spacewatch || — || align=right | 4.1 km || 
|-id=071 bgcolor=#fefefe
| 308071 ||  || — || October 7, 2004 || Kitt Peak || Spacewatch || V || align=right data-sort-value="0.69" | 690 m || 
|-id=072 bgcolor=#E9E9E9
| 308072 ||  || — || October 8, 2004 || Kitt Peak || Spacewatch || — || align=right | 5.2 km || 
|-id=073 bgcolor=#fefefe
| 308073 ||  || — || October 8, 2004 || Kitt Peak || Spacewatch || NYS || align=right data-sort-value="0.51" | 510 m || 
|-id=074 bgcolor=#fefefe
| 308074 ||  || — || October 9, 2004 || Anderson Mesa || LONEOS || — || align=right | 1.1 km || 
|-id=075 bgcolor=#fefefe
| 308075 ||  || — || October 9, 2004 || Kitt Peak || Spacewatch || — || align=right | 1.1 km || 
|-id=076 bgcolor=#fefefe
| 308076 ||  || — || October 10, 2004 || Socorro || LINEAR || FLO || align=right data-sort-value="0.71" | 710 m || 
|-id=077 bgcolor=#d6d6d6
| 308077 ||  || — || October 9, 2004 || Kitt Peak || Spacewatch || ULA7:4 || align=right | 5.4 km || 
|-id=078 bgcolor=#fefefe
| 308078 ||  || — || October 10, 2004 || Kitt Peak || Spacewatch || — || align=right data-sort-value="0.83" | 830 m || 
|-id=079 bgcolor=#fefefe
| 308079 ||  || — || October 10, 2004 || Kitt Peak || Spacewatch || — || align=right data-sort-value="0.86" | 860 m || 
|-id=080 bgcolor=#d6d6d6
| 308080 ||  || — || October 8, 2004 || Anderson Mesa || LONEOS || TRE || align=right | 4.2 km || 
|-id=081 bgcolor=#fefefe
| 308081 ||  || — || October 9, 2004 || Anderson Mesa || LONEOS || — || align=right data-sort-value="0.86" | 860 m || 
|-id=082 bgcolor=#d6d6d6
| 308082 ||  || — || October 10, 2004 || Socorro || LINEAR || — || align=right | 4.5 km || 
|-id=083 bgcolor=#fefefe
| 308083 ||  || — || October 17, 2004 || Socorro || LINEAR || H || align=right data-sort-value="0.98" | 980 m || 
|-id=084 bgcolor=#FA8072
| 308084 ||  || — || October 20, 2004 || Socorro || LINEAR || — || align=right | 1.0 km || 
|-id=085 bgcolor=#fefefe
| 308085 ||  || — || October 20, 2004 || Socorro || LINEAR || — || align=right data-sort-value="0.77" | 770 m || 
|-id=086 bgcolor=#fefefe
| 308086 ||  || — || October 21, 2004 || Socorro || LINEAR || — || align=right data-sort-value="0.87" | 870 m || 
|-id=087 bgcolor=#fefefe
| 308087 ||  || — || November 2, 2004 || Palomar || NEAT || FLO || align=right data-sort-value="0.81" | 810 m || 
|-id=088 bgcolor=#d6d6d6
| 308088 ||  || — || November 3, 2004 || Palomar || NEAT || — || align=right | 3.2 km || 
|-id=089 bgcolor=#E9E9E9
| 308089 ||  || — || November 3, 2004 || Kitt Peak || Spacewatch || — || align=right | 1.2 km || 
|-id=090 bgcolor=#E9E9E9
| 308090 ||  || — || November 3, 2004 || Catalina || CSS || MAR || align=right | 1.9 km || 
|-id=091 bgcolor=#E9E9E9
| 308091 ||  || — || November 3, 2004 || Anderson Mesa || LONEOS || — || align=right | 1.4 km || 
|-id=092 bgcolor=#fefefe
| 308092 ||  || — || November 3, 2004 || Catalina || CSS || — || align=right | 1.2 km || 
|-id=093 bgcolor=#fefefe
| 308093 ||  || — || November 3, 2004 || Goodricke-Pigott || R. A. Tucker || — || align=right | 1.6 km || 
|-id=094 bgcolor=#fefefe
| 308094 ||  || — || November 4, 2004 || Anderson Mesa || LONEOS || V || align=right data-sort-value="0.94" | 940 m || 
|-id=095 bgcolor=#d6d6d6
| 308095 ||  || — || October 18, 2004 || Kitt Peak || Spacewatch || — || align=right | 5.0 km || 
|-id=096 bgcolor=#fefefe
| 308096 ||  || — || November 4, 2004 || Catalina || CSS || FLO || align=right data-sort-value="0.85" | 850 m || 
|-id=097 bgcolor=#fefefe
| 308097 ||  || — || November 4, 2004 || Catalina || CSS || — || align=right | 1.3 km || 
|-id=098 bgcolor=#E9E9E9
| 308098 ||  || — || November 6, 2004 || Catalina || CSS || — || align=right | 1.8 km || 
|-id=099 bgcolor=#fefefe
| 308099 ||  || — || November 3, 2004 || Kitt Peak || Spacewatch || — || align=right data-sort-value="0.87" | 870 m || 
|-id=100 bgcolor=#fefefe
| 308100 ||  || — || November 4, 2004 || Kitt Peak || Spacewatch || — || align=right data-sort-value="0.71" | 710 m || 
|}

308101–308200 

|-bgcolor=#fefefe
| 308101 ||  || — || November 4, 2004 || Catalina || CSS || — || align=right data-sort-value="0.86" | 860 m || 
|-id=102 bgcolor=#fefefe
| 308102 ||  || — || November 9, 2004 || Catalina || CSS || FLO || align=right data-sort-value="0.80" | 800 m || 
|-id=103 bgcolor=#fefefe
| 308103 ||  || — || November 10, 2004 || Kitt Peak || Spacewatch || — || align=right data-sort-value="0.92" | 920 m || 
|-id=104 bgcolor=#fefefe
| 308104 ||  || — || November 4, 2004 || Catalina || CSS || FLO || align=right data-sort-value="0.72" | 720 m || 
|-id=105 bgcolor=#fefefe
| 308105 ||  || — || November 9, 2004 || Mauna Kea || C. Veillet || — || align=right data-sort-value="0.71" | 710 m || 
|-id=106 bgcolor=#d6d6d6
| 308106 ||  || — || November 17, 2004 || Siding Spring || SSS || Tj (2.95) || align=right | 6.5 km || 
|-id=107 bgcolor=#fefefe
| 308107 ||  || — || November 30, 2004 || Socorro || LINEAR || H || align=right data-sort-value="0.91" | 910 m || 
|-id=108 bgcolor=#FA8072
| 308108 ||  || — || December 1, 2004 || Catalina || CSS || — || align=right | 1.2 km || 
|-id=109 bgcolor=#fefefe
| 308109 ||  || — || December 2, 2004 || Catalina || CSS || NYS || align=right data-sort-value="0.82" | 820 m || 
|-id=110 bgcolor=#fefefe
| 308110 ||  || — || December 1, 2004 || Palomar || NEAT || H || align=right | 1.1 km || 
|-id=111 bgcolor=#fefefe
| 308111 ||  || — || December 8, 2004 || Socorro || LINEAR || — || align=right | 1.2 km || 
|-id=112 bgcolor=#fefefe
| 308112 ||  || — || December 8, 2004 || Socorro || LINEAR || V || align=right data-sort-value="0.93" | 930 m || 
|-id=113 bgcolor=#E9E9E9
| 308113 ||  || — || December 9, 2004 || Socorro || LINEAR || — || align=right | 2.0 km || 
|-id=114 bgcolor=#fefefe
| 308114 ||  || — || December 10, 2004 || Socorro || LINEAR || V || align=right data-sort-value="0.86" | 860 m || 
|-id=115 bgcolor=#fefefe
| 308115 ||  || — || December 10, 2004 || Socorro || LINEAR || V || align=right data-sort-value="0.88" | 880 m || 
|-id=116 bgcolor=#fefefe
| 308116 ||  || — || December 8, 2004 || Socorro || LINEAR || V || align=right data-sort-value="0.93" | 930 m || 
|-id=117 bgcolor=#FA8072
| 308117 ||  || — || December 10, 2004 || Socorro || LINEAR || — || align=right | 2.0 km || 
|-id=118 bgcolor=#fefefe
| 308118 ||  || — || December 9, 2004 || Catalina || CSS || — || align=right | 1.2 km || 
|-id=119 bgcolor=#fefefe
| 308119 ||  || — || December 10, 2004 || Socorro || LINEAR || — || align=right | 1.3 km || 
|-id=120 bgcolor=#fefefe
| 308120 ||  || — || December 12, 2004 || Kitt Peak || Spacewatch || — || align=right data-sort-value="0.96" | 960 m || 
|-id=121 bgcolor=#E9E9E9
| 308121 ||  || — || December 9, 2004 || Catalina || CSS || — || align=right | 2.9 km || 
|-id=122 bgcolor=#E9E9E9
| 308122 ||  || — || December 10, 2004 || Anderson Mesa || LONEOS || — || align=right | 3.8 km || 
|-id=123 bgcolor=#E9E9E9
| 308123 ||  || — || December 14, 2004 || Catalina || CSS || — || align=right | 4.0 km || 
|-id=124 bgcolor=#E9E9E9
| 308124 ||  || — || December 9, 2004 || Socorro || LINEAR || — || align=right | 1.5 km || 
|-id=125 bgcolor=#E9E9E9
| 308125 ||  || — || December 13, 2004 || Anderson Mesa || LONEOS || — || align=right | 1.8 km || 
|-id=126 bgcolor=#fefefe
| 308126 ||  || — || December 14, 2004 || Catalina || CSS || — || align=right | 1.1 km || 
|-id=127 bgcolor=#FFC2E0
| 308127 ||  || — || December 14, 2004 || Catalina || CSS || AMO +1km || align=right | 1.1 km || 
|-id=128 bgcolor=#FA8072
| 308128 ||  || — || December 15, 2004 || Socorro || LINEAR || — || align=right | 1.3 km || 
|-id=129 bgcolor=#fefefe
| 308129 ||  || — || December 13, 2004 || Kitt Peak || Spacewatch || — || align=right | 1.4 km || 
|-id=130 bgcolor=#fefefe
| 308130 ||  || — || December 13, 2004 || Kitt Peak || Spacewatch || — || align=right data-sort-value="0.92" | 920 m || 
|-id=131 bgcolor=#fefefe
| 308131 ||  || — || December 15, 2004 || Socorro || LINEAR || PHO || align=right | 1.8 km || 
|-id=132 bgcolor=#E9E9E9
| 308132 ||  || — || December 10, 2004 || Socorro || LINEAR || — || align=right | 3.1 km || 
|-id=133 bgcolor=#fefefe
| 308133 ||  || — || December 9, 2004 || Kitt Peak || Spacewatch || — || align=right data-sort-value="0.88" | 880 m || 
|-id=134 bgcolor=#fefefe
| 308134 ||  || — || December 9, 2004 || Catalina || CSS || — || align=right | 1.3 km || 
|-id=135 bgcolor=#fefefe
| 308135 ||  || — || December 19, 2004 || Socorro || LINEAR || — || align=right | 3.9 km || 
|-id=136 bgcolor=#E9E9E9
| 308136 ||  || — || December 18, 2004 || Mount Lemmon || Mount Lemmon Survey || — || align=right | 1.4 km || 
|-id=137 bgcolor=#fefefe
| 308137 ||  || — || December 18, 2004 || Mount Lemmon || Mount Lemmon Survey || NYS || align=right data-sort-value="0.69" | 690 m || 
|-id=138 bgcolor=#d6d6d6
| 308138 ||  || — || December 18, 2004 || Mount Lemmon || Mount Lemmon Survey || — || align=right | 4.8 km || 
|-id=139 bgcolor=#fefefe
| 308139 ||  || — || December 18, 2004 || Mount Lemmon || Mount Lemmon Survey || — || align=right | 1.2 km || 
|-id=140 bgcolor=#E9E9E9
| 308140 ||  || — || December 16, 2004 || Anderson Mesa || LONEOS || — || align=right | 1.6 km || 
|-id=141 bgcolor=#fefefe
| 308141 ||  || — || December 18, 2004 || Mount Lemmon || Mount Lemmon Survey || NYS || align=right data-sort-value="0.92" | 920 m || 
|-id=142 bgcolor=#fefefe
| 308142 ||  || — || January 6, 2005 || Catalina || CSS || V || align=right data-sort-value="0.83" | 830 m || 
|-id=143 bgcolor=#fefefe
| 308143 ||  || — || January 6, 2005 || Socorro || LINEAR || H || align=right data-sort-value="0.91" | 910 m || 
|-id=144 bgcolor=#E9E9E9
| 308144 ||  || — || January 6, 2005 || Catalina || CSS || GEF || align=right | 1.9 km || 
|-id=145 bgcolor=#fefefe
| 308145 ||  || — || January 6, 2005 || Socorro || LINEAR || — || align=right data-sort-value="0.92" | 920 m || 
|-id=146 bgcolor=#fefefe
| 308146 ||  || — || January 7, 2005 || Socorro || LINEAR || MAS || align=right data-sort-value="0.75" | 750 m || 
|-id=147 bgcolor=#fefefe
| 308147 ||  || — || January 6, 2005 || Socorro || LINEAR || — || align=right | 1.2 km || 
|-id=148 bgcolor=#fefefe
| 308148 ||  || — || January 8, 2005 || Campo Imperatore || CINEOS || MAS || align=right data-sort-value="0.92" | 920 m || 
|-id=149 bgcolor=#E9E9E9
| 308149 ||  || — || January 9, 2005 || Catalina || CSS || MIT || align=right | 5.2 km || 
|-id=150 bgcolor=#fefefe
| 308150 ||  || — || January 13, 2005 || Kitt Peak || Spacewatch || V || align=right data-sort-value="0.91" | 910 m || 
|-id=151 bgcolor=#fefefe
| 308151 ||  || — || January 13, 2005 || Catalina || CSS || FLO || align=right data-sort-value="0.94" | 940 m || 
|-id=152 bgcolor=#E9E9E9
| 308152 ||  || — || January 13, 2005 || Kitt Peak || Spacewatch || MAR || align=right | 1.2 km || 
|-id=153 bgcolor=#fefefe
| 308153 ||  || — || January 13, 2005 || Kitt Peak || Spacewatch || NYS || align=right data-sort-value="0.77" | 770 m || 
|-id=154 bgcolor=#fefefe
| 308154 ||  || — || January 13, 2005 || Socorro || LINEAR || — || align=right | 1.1 km || 
|-id=155 bgcolor=#fefefe
| 308155 ||  || — || January 15, 2005 || Socorro || LINEAR || — || align=right data-sort-value="0.96" | 960 m || 
|-id=156 bgcolor=#fefefe
| 308156 ||  || — || January 13, 2005 || Kitt Peak || Spacewatch || V || align=right data-sort-value="0.88" | 880 m || 
|-id=157 bgcolor=#fefefe
| 308157 ||  || — || January 15, 2005 || Kitt Peak || Spacewatch || — || align=right | 1.0 km || 
|-id=158 bgcolor=#fefefe
| 308158 ||  || — || January 15, 2005 || Kitt Peak || Spacewatch || — || align=right | 1.1 km || 
|-id=159 bgcolor=#fefefe
| 308159 ||  || — || January 15, 2005 || Kitt Peak || Spacewatch || — || align=right | 1.0 km || 
|-id=160 bgcolor=#fefefe
| 308160 ||  || — || January 15, 2005 || Kitt Peak || Spacewatch || MAS || align=right data-sort-value="0.82" | 820 m || 
|-id=161 bgcolor=#fefefe
| 308161 ||  || — || January 16, 2005 || Socorro || LINEAR || SUL || align=right | 2.7 km || 
|-id=162 bgcolor=#fefefe
| 308162 ||  || — || January 16, 2005 || Socorro || LINEAR || V || align=right data-sort-value="0.88" | 880 m || 
|-id=163 bgcolor=#fefefe
| 308163 ||  || — || January 16, 2005 || Kitt Peak || Spacewatch || — || align=right data-sort-value="0.87" | 870 m || 
|-id=164 bgcolor=#fefefe
| 308164 ||  || — || January 16, 2005 || Kitt Peak || Spacewatch || MAS || align=right data-sort-value="0.73" | 730 m || 
|-id=165 bgcolor=#fefefe
| 308165 ||  || — || January 16, 2005 || Socorro || LINEAR || FLO || align=right data-sort-value="0.90" | 900 m || 
|-id=166 bgcolor=#fefefe
| 308166 ||  || — || January 16, 2005 || Socorro || LINEAR || V || align=right data-sort-value="0.89" | 890 m || 
|-id=167 bgcolor=#fefefe
| 308167 ||  || — || January 16, 2005 || Kitt Peak || Spacewatch || — || align=right data-sort-value="0.76" | 760 m || 
|-id=168 bgcolor=#fefefe
| 308168 ||  || — || January 16, 2005 || Kitt Peak || Spacewatch || — || align=right | 1.1 km || 
|-id=169 bgcolor=#fefefe
| 308169 ||  || — || January 16, 2005 || Kitt Peak || Spacewatch || NYS || align=right | 1.0 km || 
|-id=170 bgcolor=#fefefe
| 308170 ||  || — || January 16, 2005 || Mauna Kea || C. Veillet || — || align=right data-sort-value="0.73" | 730 m || 
|-id=171 bgcolor=#fefefe
| 308171 ||  || — || January 16, 2005 || Mauna Kea || C. Veillet || MAS || align=right | 1.0 km || 
|-id=172 bgcolor=#fefefe
| 308172 ||  || — || February 1, 2005 || Kitt Peak || Spacewatch || NYS || align=right data-sort-value="0.94" | 940 m || 
|-id=173 bgcolor=#fefefe
| 308173 ||  || — || February 1, 2005 || Catalina || CSS || NYS || align=right data-sort-value="0.74" | 740 m || 
|-id=174 bgcolor=#fefefe
| 308174 ||  || — || February 2, 2005 || Kitt Peak || Spacewatch || V || align=right data-sort-value="0.82" | 820 m || 
|-id=175 bgcolor=#E9E9E9
| 308175 ||  || — || February 2, 2005 || Kitt Peak || Spacewatch || — || align=right | 1.7 km || 
|-id=176 bgcolor=#fefefe
| 308176 ||  || — || February 2, 2005 || Catalina || CSS || NYS || align=right data-sort-value="0.90" | 900 m || 
|-id=177 bgcolor=#fefefe
| 308177 ||  || — || February 1, 2005 || Palomar || NEAT || — || align=right data-sort-value="0.93" | 930 m || 
|-id=178 bgcolor=#E9E9E9
| 308178 ||  || — || February 1, 2005 || Catalina || CSS || — || align=right | 2.0 km || 
|-id=179 bgcolor=#fefefe
| 308179 ||  || — || February 2, 2005 || Catalina || CSS || — || align=right | 1.3 km || 
|-id=180 bgcolor=#fefefe
| 308180 ||  || — || February 1, 2005 || Kitt Peak || Spacewatch || MAS || align=right data-sort-value="0.82" | 820 m || 
|-id=181 bgcolor=#E9E9E9
| 308181 ||  || — || February 1, 2005 || Kitt Peak || Spacewatch || — || align=right | 1.3 km || 
|-id=182 bgcolor=#fefefe
| 308182 ||  || — || February 8, 2005 || Gnosca || S. Sposetti || — || align=right | 1.1 km || 
|-id=183 bgcolor=#fefefe
| 308183 ||  || — || February 3, 2005 || Socorro || LINEAR || — || align=right | 1.3 km || 
|-id=184 bgcolor=#E9E9E9
| 308184 ||  || — || February 2, 2005 || Kitt Peak || Spacewatch || — || align=right | 1.2 km || 
|-id=185 bgcolor=#fefefe
| 308185 ||  || — || February 2, 2005 || Kitt Peak || Spacewatch || — || align=right | 1.2 km || 
|-id=186 bgcolor=#fefefe
| 308186 ||  || — || February 2, 2005 || Catalina || CSS || NYS || align=right | 1.0 km || 
|-id=187 bgcolor=#E9E9E9
| 308187 ||  || — || February 2, 2005 || Catalina || CSS || — || align=right | 1.5 km || 
|-id=188 bgcolor=#fefefe
| 308188 ||  || — || February 2, 2005 || Catalina || CSS || NYS || align=right data-sort-value="0.81" | 810 m || 
|-id=189 bgcolor=#fefefe
| 308189 ||  || — || February 3, 2005 || Socorro || LINEAR || — || align=right data-sort-value="0.95" | 950 m || 
|-id=190 bgcolor=#fefefe
| 308190 ||  || — || February 4, 2005 || Kitt Peak || Spacewatch || NYS || align=right data-sort-value="0.72" | 720 m || 
|-id=191 bgcolor=#E9E9E9
| 308191 ||  || — || February 3, 2005 || Calvin-Rehoboth || Calvin–Rehoboth Obs. || — || align=right | 1.1 km || 
|-id=192 bgcolor=#fefefe
| 308192 ||  || — || February 9, 2005 || Socorro || LINEAR || — || align=right | 1.2 km || 
|-id=193 bgcolor=#C2E0FF
| 308193 ||  || — || February 6, 2005 || Palomar || Palomar Obs. || Haumeacritical || align=right | 495 km || 
|-id=194 bgcolor=#E9E9E9
| 308194 ||  || — || March 2, 2005 || Catalina || CSS || EUN || align=right | 1.6 km || 
|-id=195 bgcolor=#FA8072
| 308195 ||  || — || March 2, 2005 || Catalina || CSS || — || align=right data-sort-value="0.98" | 980 m || 
|-id=196 bgcolor=#fefefe
| 308196 ||  || — || March 3, 2005 || Kitt Peak || Spacewatch || NYS || align=right data-sort-value="0.77" | 770 m || 
|-id=197 bgcolor=#fefefe
| 308197 Satrapi ||  ||  || March 3, 2005 || Nogales || J.-C. Merlin || NYS || align=right data-sort-value="0.72" | 720 m || 
|-id=198 bgcolor=#FA8072
| 308198 ||  || — || March 3, 2005 || Socorro || LINEAR || — || align=right data-sort-value="0.47" | 470 m || 
|-id=199 bgcolor=#d6d6d6
| 308199 ||  || — || March 4, 2005 || Junk Bond || Junk Bond Obs. || NAE || align=right | 3.8 km || 
|-id=200 bgcolor=#fefefe
| 308200 ||  || — || March 4, 2005 || Catalina || CSS || — || align=right | 1.4 km || 
|}

308201–308300 

|-bgcolor=#fefefe
| 308201 ||  || — || March 3, 2005 || Kitt Peak || Spacewatch || H || align=right data-sort-value="0.81" | 810 m || 
|-id=202 bgcolor=#fefefe
| 308202 ||  || — || March 3, 2005 || Catalina || CSS || NYS || align=right data-sort-value="0.86" | 860 m || 
|-id=203 bgcolor=#fefefe
| 308203 ||  || — || March 3, 2005 || Catalina || CSS || NYS || align=right data-sort-value="0.88" | 880 m || 
|-id=204 bgcolor=#fefefe
| 308204 ||  || — || March 4, 2005 || Catalina || CSS || — || align=right | 1.0 km || 
|-id=205 bgcolor=#fefefe
| 308205 ||  || — || March 4, 2005 || Socorro || LINEAR || NYS || align=right data-sort-value="0.79" | 790 m || 
|-id=206 bgcolor=#fefefe
| 308206 ||  || — || March 7, 2005 || Socorro || LINEAR || — || align=right | 1.2 km || 
|-id=207 bgcolor=#fefefe
| 308207 ||  || — || March 3, 2005 || Catalina || CSS || MAS || align=right | 1.0 km || 
|-id=208 bgcolor=#fefefe
| 308208 ||  || — || March 4, 2005 || Kitt Peak || Spacewatch || NYS || align=right data-sort-value="0.66" | 660 m || 
|-id=209 bgcolor=#E9E9E9
| 308209 ||  || — || March 8, 2005 || Kitt Peak || Spacewatch || — || align=right data-sort-value="0.97" | 970 m || 
|-id=210 bgcolor=#E9E9E9
| 308210 ||  || — || March 8, 2005 || Mount Lemmon || Mount Lemmon Survey || — || align=right data-sort-value="0.99" | 990 m || 
|-id=211 bgcolor=#d6d6d6
| 308211 ||  || — || March 9, 2005 || Socorro || LINEAR || — || align=right | 4.2 km || 
|-id=212 bgcolor=#E9E9E9
| 308212 ||  || — || March 3, 2005 || Catalina || CSS || — || align=right | 1.7 km || 
|-id=213 bgcolor=#fefefe
| 308213 ||  || — || March 3, 2005 || Catalina || CSS || — || align=right | 1.0 km || 
|-id=214 bgcolor=#fefefe
| 308214 ||  || — || March 9, 2005 || Mount Lemmon || Mount Lemmon Survey || ERI || align=right | 1.5 km || 
|-id=215 bgcolor=#E9E9E9
| 308215 ||  || — || March 9, 2005 || Mount Lemmon || Mount Lemmon Survey || — || align=right | 2.5 km || 
|-id=216 bgcolor=#E9E9E9
| 308216 ||  || — || March 10, 2005 || Mount Lemmon || Mount Lemmon Survey || — || align=right | 2.7 km || 
|-id=217 bgcolor=#E9E9E9
| 308217 ||  || — || March 10, 2005 || Mount Lemmon || Mount Lemmon Survey || — || align=right | 1.0 km || 
|-id=218 bgcolor=#E9E9E9
| 308218 ||  || — || March 10, 2005 || Kitt Peak || Spacewatch || KRM || align=right | 2.4 km || 
|-id=219 bgcolor=#fefefe
| 308219 ||  || — || March 9, 2005 || Mount Lemmon || Mount Lemmon Survey || — || align=right data-sort-value="0.94" | 940 m || 
|-id=220 bgcolor=#E9E9E9
| 308220 ||  || — || March 9, 2005 || Mount Lemmon || Mount Lemmon Survey || — || align=right | 1.2 km || 
|-id=221 bgcolor=#fefefe
| 308221 ||  || — || March 10, 2005 || Mount Lemmon || Mount Lemmon Survey || NYS || align=right data-sort-value="0.72" | 720 m || 
|-id=222 bgcolor=#fefefe
| 308222 ||  || — || March 11, 2005 || Mount Lemmon || Mount Lemmon Survey || — || align=right | 1.1 km || 
|-id=223 bgcolor=#fefefe
| 308223 ||  || — || March 13, 2005 || Catalina || CSS || — || align=right data-sort-value="0.94" | 940 m || 
|-id=224 bgcolor=#fefefe
| 308224 ||  || — || March 4, 2005 || Kitt Peak || Spacewatch || NYS || align=right data-sort-value="0.82" | 820 m || 
|-id=225 bgcolor=#E9E9E9
| 308225 ||  || — || March 10, 2005 || Mount Lemmon || Mount Lemmon Survey || — || align=right | 1.6 km || 
|-id=226 bgcolor=#E9E9E9
| 308226 ||  || — || March 10, 2005 || Anderson Mesa || LONEOS || — || align=right | 2.5 km || 
|-id=227 bgcolor=#E9E9E9
| 308227 ||  || — || March 11, 2005 || Kitt Peak || Spacewatch || — || align=right data-sort-value="0.91" | 910 m || 
|-id=228 bgcolor=#fefefe
| 308228 ||  || — || March 14, 2005 || Catalina || CSS || — || align=right | 1.5 km || 
|-id=229 bgcolor=#E9E9E9
| 308229 ||  || — || March 10, 2005 || Mount Lemmon || Mount Lemmon Survey || — || align=right | 1.8 km || 
|-id=230 bgcolor=#E9E9E9
| 308230 ||  || — || March 11, 2005 || Mount Lemmon || Mount Lemmon Survey || — || align=right | 1.5 km || 
|-id=231 bgcolor=#E9E9E9
| 308231 ||  || — || March 11, 2005 || Mount Lemmon || Mount Lemmon Survey || — || align=right | 1.6 km || 
|-id=232 bgcolor=#fefefe
| 308232 ||  || — || March 11, 2005 || Kitt Peak || Spacewatch || NYS || align=right data-sort-value="0.77" | 770 m || 
|-id=233 bgcolor=#E9E9E9
| 308233 ||  || — || March 12, 2005 || Socorro || LINEAR || — || align=right | 1.7 km || 
|-id=234 bgcolor=#E9E9E9
| 308234 ||  || — || March 10, 2005 || Catalina || CSS || — || align=right | 1.6 km || 
|-id=235 bgcolor=#fefefe
| 308235 ||  || — || March 9, 2005 || Mount Lemmon || Mount Lemmon Survey || — || align=right data-sort-value="0.88" | 880 m || 
|-id=236 bgcolor=#E9E9E9
| 308236 ||  || — || March 10, 2005 || Mount Lemmon || Mount Lemmon Survey || — || align=right | 1.0 km || 
|-id=237 bgcolor=#fefefe
| 308237 ||  || — || March 12, 2005 || Kitt Peak || M. W. Buie || — || align=right | 1.0 km || 
|-id=238 bgcolor=#E9E9E9
| 308238 ||  || — || March 13, 2005 || Catalina || CSS || — || align=right | 1.0 km || 
|-id=239 bgcolor=#E9E9E9
| 308239 ||  || — || March 16, 2005 || Catalina || CSS || JUN || align=right | 1.4 km || 
|-id=240 bgcolor=#E9E9E9
| 308240 ||  || — || April 1, 2005 || Kitt Peak || Spacewatch || MAR || align=right | 1.2 km || 
|-id=241 bgcolor=#E9E9E9
| 308241 ||  || — || April 1, 2005 || Anderson Mesa || LONEOS || — || align=right | 1.2 km || 
|-id=242 bgcolor=#FFC2E0
| 308242 ||  || — || April 1, 2005 || Siding Spring || SSS || ATE +1kmPHA || align=right | 1.9 km || 
|-id=243 bgcolor=#E9E9E9
| 308243 ||  || — || April 1, 2005 || Anderson Mesa || LONEOS || — || align=right | 1.4 km || 
|-id=244 bgcolor=#E9E9E9
| 308244 ||  || — || April 3, 2005 || Palomar || NEAT || — || align=right | 1.4 km || 
|-id=245 bgcolor=#fefefe
| 308245 ||  || — || April 5, 2005 || Mount Lemmon || Mount Lemmon Survey || — || align=right | 1.1 km || 
|-id=246 bgcolor=#fefefe
| 308246 ||  || — || April 5, 2005 || Mount Lemmon || Mount Lemmon Survey || FLO || align=right data-sort-value="0.63" | 630 m || 
|-id=247 bgcolor=#E9E9E9
| 308247 ||  || — || April 5, 2005 || Mount Lemmon || Mount Lemmon Survey || — || align=right | 1.2 km || 
|-id=248 bgcolor=#E9E9E9
| 308248 ||  || — || April 5, 2005 || Mount Lemmon || Mount Lemmon Survey || — || align=right | 1.6 km || 
|-id=249 bgcolor=#E9E9E9
| 308249 ||  || — || April 6, 2005 || Mayhill || A. Lowe || — || align=right | 2.8 km || 
|-id=250 bgcolor=#fefefe
| 308250 ||  || — || April 9, 2005 || Catalina || CSS || PHO || align=right | 2.3 km || 
|-id=251 bgcolor=#E9E9E9
| 308251 ||  || — || April 2, 2005 || Catalina || CSS || MAR || align=right | 1.5 km || 
|-id=252 bgcolor=#E9E9E9
| 308252 ||  || — || March 11, 2005 || Kitt Peak || Spacewatch || — || align=right | 3.0 km || 
|-id=253 bgcolor=#E9E9E9
| 308253 ||  || — || April 4, 2005 || Catalina || CSS || — || align=right | 2.6 km || 
|-id=254 bgcolor=#E9E9E9
| 308254 ||  || — || April 5, 2005 || Catalina || CSS || — || align=right | 1.3 km || 
|-id=255 bgcolor=#E9E9E9
| 308255 ||  || — || April 5, 2005 || Mount Lemmon || Mount Lemmon Survey || WIT || align=right data-sort-value="0.86" | 860 m || 
|-id=256 bgcolor=#E9E9E9
| 308256 ||  || — || April 6, 2005 || Catalina || CSS || — || align=right | 1.9 km || 
|-id=257 bgcolor=#E9E9E9
| 308257 ||  || — || April 7, 2005 || Kitt Peak || Spacewatch || — || align=right | 1.2 km || 
|-id=258 bgcolor=#E9E9E9
| 308258 ||  || — || April 4, 2005 || Socorro || LINEAR || — || align=right | 3.0 km || 
|-id=259 bgcolor=#E9E9E9
| 308259 ||  || — || March 17, 2005 || Mount Lemmon || Mount Lemmon Survey || — || align=right data-sort-value="0.99" | 990 m || 
|-id=260 bgcolor=#E9E9E9
| 308260 ||  || — || April 6, 2005 || Kitt Peak || Spacewatch || — || align=right | 1.5 km || 
|-id=261 bgcolor=#E9E9E9
| 308261 ||  || — || April 6, 2005 || Catalina || CSS || — || align=right | 2.5 km || 
|-id=262 bgcolor=#E9E9E9
| 308262 ||  || — || April 7, 2005 || Kitt Peak || Spacewatch || — || align=right | 1.6 km || 
|-id=263 bgcolor=#fefefe
| 308263 ||  || — || April 9, 2005 || Kitt Peak || Spacewatch || MAS || align=right data-sort-value="0.73" | 730 m || 
|-id=264 bgcolor=#E9E9E9
| 308264 ||  || — || April 10, 2005 || Kitt Peak || Spacewatch || — || align=right | 1.2 km || 
|-id=265 bgcolor=#E9E9E9
| 308265 ||  || — || April 11, 2005 || Mount Lemmon || Mount Lemmon Survey || — || align=right | 2.0 km || 
|-id=266 bgcolor=#E9E9E9
| 308266 ||  || — || April 9, 2005 || Siding Spring || SSS || — || align=right | 1.7 km || 
|-id=267 bgcolor=#fefefe
| 308267 ||  || — || April 6, 2005 || Mount Lemmon || Mount Lemmon Survey || NYS || align=right data-sort-value="0.70" | 700 m || 
|-id=268 bgcolor=#d6d6d6
| 308268 ||  || — || April 6, 2005 || Mount Lemmon || Mount Lemmon Survey || — || align=right | 3.5 km || 
|-id=269 bgcolor=#E9E9E9
| 308269 ||  || — || April 12, 2005 || Anderson Mesa || LONEOS || — || align=right | 2.5 km || 
|-id=270 bgcolor=#E9E9E9
| 308270 ||  || — || April 11, 2005 || Kitt Peak || Spacewatch || AGN || align=right | 1.4 km || 
|-id=271 bgcolor=#E9E9E9
| 308271 ||  || — || April 12, 2005 || Kitt Peak || Spacewatch || — || align=right | 1.8 km || 
|-id=272 bgcolor=#E9E9E9
| 308272 ||  || — || April 13, 2005 || Anderson Mesa || LONEOS || — || align=right | 2.3 km || 
|-id=273 bgcolor=#FA8072
| 308273 ||  || — || April 10, 2005 || Mount Lemmon || Mount Lemmon Survey || — || align=right | 1.7 km || 
|-id=274 bgcolor=#E9E9E9
| 308274 ||  || — || April 12, 2005 || Kitt Peak || Spacewatch || — || align=right | 3.3 km || 
|-id=275 bgcolor=#E9E9E9
| 308275 ||  || — || April 11, 2005 || Anderson Mesa || LONEOS || — || align=right | 1.0 km || 
|-id=276 bgcolor=#fefefe
| 308276 ||  || — || April 12, 2005 || Kitt Peak || Spacewatch || MAS || align=right data-sort-value="0.90" | 900 m || 
|-id=277 bgcolor=#E9E9E9
| 308277 ||  || — || April 12, 2005 || Anderson Mesa || LONEOS || — || align=right | 1.5 km || 
|-id=278 bgcolor=#fefefe
| 308278 ||  || — || March 11, 2005 || Kitt Peak || Spacewatch || — || align=right data-sort-value="0.86" | 860 m || 
|-id=279 bgcolor=#E9E9E9
| 308279 ||  || — || April 5, 2005 || Kitt Peak || Spacewatch || EUN || align=right | 1.5 km || 
|-id=280 bgcolor=#E9E9E9
| 308280 ||  || — || April 1, 2005 || Catalina || CSS || MAR || align=right | 1.3 km || 
|-id=281 bgcolor=#E9E9E9
| 308281 ||  || — || April 6, 2005 || Catalina || CSS || — || align=right | 1.9 km || 
|-id=282 bgcolor=#E9E9E9
| 308282 ||  || — || April 6, 2005 || Catalina || CSS || — || align=right | 1.4 km || 
|-id=283 bgcolor=#E9E9E9
| 308283 ||  || — || April 30, 2005 || Anderson Mesa || LONEOS || — || align=right | 4.2 km || 
|-id=284 bgcolor=#E9E9E9
| 308284 ||  || — || May 3, 2005 || Kitt Peak || Spacewatch || — || align=right | 1.2 km || 
|-id=285 bgcolor=#E9E9E9
| 308285 ||  || — || May 1, 2005 || Palomar || NEAT || JUN || align=right | 1.3 km || 
|-id=286 bgcolor=#E9E9E9
| 308286 ||  || — || May 3, 2005 || Kitt Peak || Spacewatch || — || align=right | 2.4 km || 
|-id=287 bgcolor=#E9E9E9
| 308287 ||  || — || May 4, 2005 || Palomar || NEAT || — || align=right | 1.5 km || 
|-id=288 bgcolor=#E9E9E9
| 308288 ||  || — || May 6, 2005 || Socorro || LINEAR || — || align=right | 1.2 km || 
|-id=289 bgcolor=#E9E9E9
| 308289 ||  || — || May 3, 2005 || Kitt Peak || Spacewatch || — || align=right | 1.0 km || 
|-id=290 bgcolor=#E9E9E9
| 308290 ||  || — || May 4, 2005 || Kitt Peak || Spacewatch || MRX || align=right | 1.1 km || 
|-id=291 bgcolor=#E9E9E9
| 308291 ||  || — || May 6, 2005 || Kitt Peak || Spacewatch || — || align=right | 2.2 km || 
|-id=292 bgcolor=#E9E9E9
| 308292 ||  || — || May 9, 2005 || Catalina || CSS || JUN || align=right | 1.1 km || 
|-id=293 bgcolor=#fefefe
| 308293 ||  || — || May 8, 2005 || Kitt Peak || Spacewatch || — || align=right | 1.1 km || 
|-id=294 bgcolor=#E9E9E9
| 308294 ||  || — || May 11, 2005 || Anderson Mesa || LONEOS || — || align=right | 1.3 km || 
|-id=295 bgcolor=#E9E9E9
| 308295 ||  || — || May 9, 2005 || Kitt Peak || Spacewatch || — || align=right | 1.9 km || 
|-id=296 bgcolor=#E9E9E9
| 308296 ||  || — || May 9, 2005 || Catalina || CSS || — || align=right | 2.7 km || 
|-id=297 bgcolor=#E9E9E9
| 308297 ||  || — || May 10, 2005 || Kitt Peak || Spacewatch || — || align=right | 1.7 km || 
|-id=298 bgcolor=#E9E9E9
| 308298 ||  || — || May 13, 2005 || Socorro || LINEAR || — || align=right | 1.4 km || 
|-id=299 bgcolor=#E9E9E9
| 308299 ||  || — || May 13, 2005 || Kitt Peak || Spacewatch || — || align=right | 2.4 km || 
|-id=300 bgcolor=#E9E9E9
| 308300 ||  || — || May 14, 2005 || Socorro || LINEAR || EUN || align=right | 1.3 km || 
|}

308301–308400 

|-bgcolor=#E9E9E9
| 308301 ||  || — || May 15, 2005 || Mount Lemmon || Mount Lemmon Survey || JUN || align=right | 2.8 km || 
|-id=302 bgcolor=#E9E9E9
| 308302 ||  || — || August 14, 2001 || Palomar || NEAT || — || align=right | 3.4 km || 
|-id=303 bgcolor=#E9E9E9
| 308303 ||  || — || May 8, 2005 || Mount Lemmon || Mount Lemmon Survey || PAD || align=right | 3.0 km || 
|-id=304 bgcolor=#E9E9E9
| 308304 ||  || — || May 10, 2005 || Kitt Peak || Spacewatch || HNS || align=right | 1.8 km || 
|-id=305 bgcolor=#E9E9E9
| 308305 ||  || — || May 16, 2005 || Kitt Peak || Spacewatch || — || align=right data-sort-value="0.90" | 900 m || 
|-id=306 bgcolor=#FA8072
| 308306 Dainere ||  ||  || May 19, 2005 || Siding Spring || SSS || unusual || align=right | 3.2 km || 
|-id=307 bgcolor=#E9E9E9
| 308307 ||  || — || May 29, 2005 || Reedy Creek || J. Broughton || ADE || align=right | 2.4 km || 
|-id=308 bgcolor=#E9E9E9
| 308308 ||  || — || May 19, 2005 || Mount Lemmon || Mount Lemmon Survey || — || align=right | 1.3 km || 
|-id=309 bgcolor=#E9E9E9
| 308309 ||  || — || June 1, 2005 || Kitt Peak || Spacewatch || — || align=right | 2.0 km || 
|-id=310 bgcolor=#E9E9E9
| 308310 ||  || — || June 1, 2005 || Kitt Peak || Spacewatch || MAR || align=right | 1.3 km || 
|-id=311 bgcolor=#E9E9E9
| 308311 ||  || — || June 4, 2005 || Kitt Peak || Spacewatch || — || align=right | 3.3 km || 
|-id=312 bgcolor=#d6d6d6
| 308312 ||  || — || June 11, 2005 || Kitt Peak || Spacewatch || — || align=right | 3.9 km || 
|-id=313 bgcolor=#E9E9E9
| 308313 ||  || — || June 13, 2005 || Kitt Peak || Spacewatch || — || align=right | 1.6 km || 
|-id=314 bgcolor=#C2FFFF
| 308314 ||  || — || June 13, 2005 || Kitt Peak || Spacewatch || L4 || align=right | 15 km || 
|-id=315 bgcolor=#d6d6d6
| 308315 ||  || — || June 8, 2005 || Siding Spring || SSS || EUP || align=right | 5.6 km || 
|-id=316 bgcolor=#d6d6d6
| 308316 ||  || — || June 7, 2005 || Siding Spring || SSS || — || align=right | 3.9 km || 
|-id=317 bgcolor=#E9E9E9
| 308317 ||  || — || June 27, 2005 || Kitt Peak || Spacewatch || — || align=right | 2.8 km || 
|-id=318 bgcolor=#d6d6d6
| 308318 ||  || — || June 27, 2005 || Kitt Peak || Spacewatch || — || align=right | 4.4 km || 
|-id=319 bgcolor=#d6d6d6
| 308319 ||  || — || June 30, 2005 || Kitt Peak || Spacewatch || KOR || align=right | 1.5 km || 
|-id=320 bgcolor=#d6d6d6
| 308320 ||  || — || June 29, 2005 || Kitt Peak || Spacewatch || TRE || align=right | 4.0 km || 
|-id=321 bgcolor=#d6d6d6
| 308321 ||  || — || June 30, 2005 || Kitt Peak || Spacewatch || — || align=right | 2.4 km || 
|-id=322 bgcolor=#d6d6d6
| 308322 ||  || — || June 30, 2005 || Kitt Peak || Spacewatch || KOR || align=right | 1.6 km || 
|-id=323 bgcolor=#d6d6d6
| 308323 ||  || — || June 30, 2005 || Palomar || NEAT || — || align=right | 4.3 km || 
|-id=324 bgcolor=#E9E9E9
| 308324 ||  || — || July 2, 2005 || Kitt Peak || Spacewatch || GEF || align=right | 1.9 km || 
|-id=325 bgcolor=#d6d6d6
| 308325 ||  || — || July 3, 2005 || Mount Lemmon || Mount Lemmon Survey || — || align=right | 3.1 km || 
|-id=326 bgcolor=#fefefe
| 308326 ||  || — || July 3, 2005 || Mount Lemmon || Mount Lemmon Survey || — || align=right | 1.0 km || 
|-id=327 bgcolor=#d6d6d6
| 308327 ||  || — || July 4, 2005 || Kitt Peak || Spacewatch || BRA || align=right | 1.8 km || 
|-id=328 bgcolor=#d6d6d6
| 308328 ||  || — || July 4, 2005 || Mount Lemmon || Mount Lemmon Survey || KOR || align=right | 1.4 km || 
|-id=329 bgcolor=#E9E9E9
| 308329 ||  || — || July 5, 2005 || Kitt Peak || Spacewatch || — || align=right | 3.1 km || 
|-id=330 bgcolor=#fefefe
| 308330 ||  || — || July 10, 2005 || Catalina || CSS || NYS || align=right | 1.3 km || 
|-id=331 bgcolor=#d6d6d6
| 308331 ||  || — || July 11, 2005 || Kitt Peak || Spacewatch || — || align=right | 2.9 km || 
|-id=332 bgcolor=#E9E9E9
| 308332 ||  || — || July 3, 2005 || Mount Lemmon || Mount Lemmon Survey || AGN || align=right | 1.5 km || 
|-id=333 bgcolor=#d6d6d6
| 308333 ||  || — || July 10, 2005 || Kitt Peak || Spacewatch || — || align=right | 2.3 km || 
|-id=334 bgcolor=#d6d6d6
| 308334 ||  || — || July 10, 2005 || Kitt Peak || Spacewatch || — || align=right | 2.9 km || 
|-id=335 bgcolor=#fefefe
| 308335 ||  || — || July 30, 2005 || Palomar || NEAT || V || align=right data-sort-value="0.82" | 820 m || 
|-id=336 bgcolor=#d6d6d6
| 308336 ||  || — || July 29, 2005 || Siding Spring || SSS || — || align=right | 3.9 km || 
|-id=337 bgcolor=#d6d6d6
| 308337 ||  || — || July 30, 2005 || Palomar || NEAT || — || align=right | 3.5 km || 
|-id=338 bgcolor=#d6d6d6
| 308338 ||  || — || August 5, 2005 || Palomar || NEAT || — || align=right | 4.4 km || 
|-id=339 bgcolor=#fefefe
| 308339 ||  || — || August 15, 2005 || Siding Spring || SSS || — || align=right | 1.6 km || 
|-id=340 bgcolor=#d6d6d6
| 308340 ||  || — || August 9, 2005 || Cerro Tololo || M. W. Buie || THM || align=right | 2.7 km || 
|-id=341 bgcolor=#d6d6d6
| 308341 ||  || — || August 22, 2005 || Palomar || NEAT || LIX || align=right | 4.1 km || 
|-id=342 bgcolor=#d6d6d6
| 308342 ||  || — || August 24, 2005 || Palomar || NEAT || — || align=right | 3.3 km || 
|-id=343 bgcolor=#d6d6d6
| 308343 ||  || — || August 24, 2005 || Palomar || NEAT || — || align=right | 4.0 km || 
|-id=344 bgcolor=#d6d6d6
| 308344 ||  || — || July 29, 2005 || Palomar || NEAT || — || align=right | 2.7 km || 
|-id=345 bgcolor=#d6d6d6
| 308345 ||  || — || August 27, 2005 || Kitt Peak || Spacewatch || — || align=right | 4.1 km || 
|-id=346 bgcolor=#d6d6d6
| 308346 ||  || — || August 25, 2005 || Palomar || NEAT || — || align=right | 4.6 km || 
|-id=347 bgcolor=#d6d6d6
| 308347 ||  || — || August 26, 2005 || Palomar || NEAT || HYG || align=right | 3.3 km || 
|-id=348 bgcolor=#d6d6d6
| 308348 ||  || — || August 25, 2005 || Palomar || NEAT || EOS || align=right | 2.0 km || 
|-id=349 bgcolor=#d6d6d6
| 308349 ||  || — || August 26, 2005 || Palomar || NEAT || — || align=right | 3.3 km || 
|-id=350 bgcolor=#d6d6d6
| 308350 ||  || — || August 29, 2005 || Anderson Mesa || LONEOS || — || align=right | 3.9 km || 
|-id=351 bgcolor=#d6d6d6
| 308351 ||  || — || August 27, 2005 || Anderson Mesa || LONEOS || — || align=right | 3.5 km || 
|-id=352 bgcolor=#d6d6d6
| 308352 ||  || — || August 28, 2005 || Saint-Véran || Saint-Véran Obs. || — || align=right | 3.2 km || 
|-id=353 bgcolor=#E9E9E9
| 308353 ||  || — || August 29, 2005 || Socorro || LINEAR || — || align=right | 1.4 km || 
|-id=354 bgcolor=#E9E9E9
| 308354 ||  || — || August 30, 2005 || Anderson Mesa || LONEOS || — || align=right | 1.9 km || 
|-id=355 bgcolor=#d6d6d6
| 308355 ||  || — || August 30, 2005 || Kitt Peak || Spacewatch || HYG || align=right | 3.0 km || 
|-id=356 bgcolor=#E9E9E9
| 308356 ||  || — || August 30, 2005 || Socorro || LINEAR || — || align=right | 2.4 km || 
|-id=357 bgcolor=#d6d6d6
| 308357 ||  || — || August 28, 2005 || Kitt Peak || Spacewatch || — || align=right | 2.4 km || 
|-id=358 bgcolor=#d6d6d6
| 308358 ||  || — || August 28, 2005 || Kitt Peak || Spacewatch || KOR || align=right | 1.6 km || 
|-id=359 bgcolor=#d6d6d6
| 308359 ||  || — || August 28, 2005 || Kitt Peak || Spacewatch || — || align=right | 4.3 km || 
|-id=360 bgcolor=#E9E9E9
| 308360 ||  || — || August 31, 2005 || Campo Imperatore || CINEOS || MAR || align=right | 1.2 km || 
|-id=361 bgcolor=#d6d6d6
| 308361 ||  || — || August 30, 2005 || Anderson Mesa || LONEOS || TIR || align=right | 4.3 km || 
|-id=362 bgcolor=#d6d6d6
| 308362 ||  || — || August 30, 2005 || Kitt Peak || Spacewatch || EOS || align=right | 2.0 km || 
|-id=363 bgcolor=#d6d6d6
| 308363 ||  || — || August 31, 2005 || Palomar || NEAT || — || align=right | 3.8 km || 
|-id=364 bgcolor=#d6d6d6
| 308364 ||  || — || August 31, 2005 || Palomar || NEAT || THM || align=right | 2.4 km || 
|-id=365 bgcolor=#d6d6d6
| 308365 ||  || — || August 31, 2005 || Palomar || NEAT || — || align=right | 3.0 km || 
|-id=366 bgcolor=#d6d6d6
| 308366 ||  || — || August 27, 2005 || Palomar || NEAT || LIX || align=right | 4.5 km || 
|-id=367 bgcolor=#fefefe
| 308367 ||  || — || August 30, 2005 || Anderson Mesa || LONEOS || H || align=right data-sort-value="0.89" | 890 m || 
|-id=368 bgcolor=#d6d6d6
| 308368 ||  || — || August 27, 2005 || Palomar || NEAT || — || align=right | 3.6 km || 
|-id=369 bgcolor=#d6d6d6
| 308369 ||  || — || August 26, 2005 || Palomar || NEAT || — || align=right | 4.2 km || 
|-id=370 bgcolor=#d6d6d6
| 308370 ||  || — || August 26, 2005 || Palomar || NEAT || — || align=right | 3.9 km || 
|-id=371 bgcolor=#d6d6d6
| 308371 ||  || — || August 31, 2005 || Kitt Peak || Spacewatch || — || align=right | 3.3 km || 
|-id=372 bgcolor=#d6d6d6
| 308372 ||  || — || September 8, 2005 || Socorro || LINEAR || — || align=right | 3.8 km || 
|-id=373 bgcolor=#d6d6d6
| 308373 ||  || — || September 1, 2005 || Kitt Peak || Spacewatch || — || align=right | 3.2 km || 
|-id=374 bgcolor=#d6d6d6
| 308374 ||  || — || September 1, 2005 || Kitt Peak || Spacewatch || — || align=right | 3.2 km || 
|-id=375 bgcolor=#E9E9E9
| 308375 ||  || — || September 10, 2005 || Anderson Mesa || LONEOS || — || align=right | 3.5 km || 
|-id=376 bgcolor=#d6d6d6
| 308376 ||  || — || September 11, 2005 || Goodricke-Pigott || R. A. Tucker || EOS || align=right | 2.7 km || 
|-id=377 bgcolor=#E9E9E9
| 308377 ||  || — || September 10, 2005 || Anderson Mesa || LONEOS || — || align=right | 1.4 km || 
|-id=378 bgcolor=#d6d6d6
| 308378 ||  || — || September 13, 2005 || Anderson Mesa || LONEOS || EUP || align=right | 3.8 km || 
|-id=379 bgcolor=#C2E0FF
| 308379 ||  || — || September 13, 2005 || Apache Point || A. C. Becker, A. W. Puckett, J. Kubica || twotino || align=right | 408 km || 
|-id=380 bgcolor=#d6d6d6
| 308380 ||  || — || September 14, 2005 || Apache Point || A. C. Becker || EOS || align=right | 2.4 km || 
|-id=381 bgcolor=#d6d6d6
| 308381 ||  || — || September 23, 2005 || Kitt Peak || Spacewatch || EUP || align=right | 4.7 km || 
|-id=382 bgcolor=#d6d6d6
| 308382 ||  || — || September 23, 2005 || Kitt Peak || Spacewatch || TIR || align=right | 3.0 km || 
|-id=383 bgcolor=#d6d6d6
| 308383 ||  || — || September 23, 2005 || Kitt Peak || Spacewatch || — || align=right | 2.9 km || 
|-id=384 bgcolor=#d6d6d6
| 308384 ||  || — || September 25, 2005 || Catalina || CSS || — || align=right | 3.5 km || 
|-id=385 bgcolor=#d6d6d6
| 308385 ||  || — || September 25, 2005 || Catalina || CSS || — || align=right | 4.5 km || 
|-id=386 bgcolor=#d6d6d6
| 308386 ||  || — || September 26, 2005 || Palomar || NEAT || — || align=right | 4.4 km || 
|-id=387 bgcolor=#d6d6d6
| 308387 ||  || — || September 28, 2005 || Great Shefford || P. Birtwhistle || — || align=right | 3.3 km || 
|-id=388 bgcolor=#d6d6d6
| 308388 ||  || — || September 23, 2005 || Kitt Peak || Spacewatch || HYG || align=right | 3.8 km || 
|-id=389 bgcolor=#d6d6d6
| 308389 ||  || — || September 23, 2005 || Kitt Peak || Spacewatch || — || align=right | 3.0 km || 
|-id=390 bgcolor=#d6d6d6
| 308390 ||  || — || September 23, 2005 || Kitt Peak || Spacewatch || VER || align=right | 3.6 km || 
|-id=391 bgcolor=#d6d6d6
| 308391 ||  || — || September 23, 2005 || Kitt Peak || Spacewatch || HYG || align=right | 2.8 km || 
|-id=392 bgcolor=#d6d6d6
| 308392 ||  || — || September 23, 2005 || Kitt Peak || Spacewatch || — || align=right | 3.3 km || 
|-id=393 bgcolor=#d6d6d6
| 308393 ||  || — || September 24, 2005 || Kitt Peak || Spacewatch || — || align=right | 3.2 km || 
|-id=394 bgcolor=#d6d6d6
| 308394 ||  || — || September 24, 2005 || Kitt Peak || Spacewatch || CRO || align=right | 3.5 km || 
|-id=395 bgcolor=#d6d6d6
| 308395 ||  || — || September 24, 2005 || Kitt Peak || Spacewatch || EOS || align=right | 2.2 km || 
|-id=396 bgcolor=#d6d6d6
| 308396 ||  || — || September 24, 2005 || Kitt Peak || Spacewatch || — || align=right | 2.8 km || 
|-id=397 bgcolor=#d6d6d6
| 308397 ||  || — || September 24, 2005 || Kitt Peak || Spacewatch || — || align=right | 3.2 km || 
|-id=398 bgcolor=#d6d6d6
| 308398 ||  || — || September 24, 2005 || Kitt Peak || Spacewatch || — || align=right | 5.3 km || 
|-id=399 bgcolor=#d6d6d6
| 308399 ||  || — || September 25, 2005 || Kitt Peak || Spacewatch || EUP || align=right | 5.3 km || 
|-id=400 bgcolor=#fefefe
| 308400 ||  || — || September 26, 2005 || Kitt Peak || Spacewatch || MAS || align=right data-sort-value="0.86" | 860 m || 
|}

308401–308500 

|-bgcolor=#d6d6d6
| 308401 ||  || — || September 26, 2005 || Kitt Peak || Spacewatch || THM || align=right | 2.6 km || 
|-id=402 bgcolor=#d6d6d6
| 308402 ||  || — || September 24, 2005 || Kitt Peak || Spacewatch || — || align=right | 2.8 km || 
|-id=403 bgcolor=#d6d6d6
| 308403 ||  || — || September 24, 2005 || Kitt Peak || Spacewatch || — || align=right | 2.3 km || 
|-id=404 bgcolor=#d6d6d6
| 308404 ||  || — || September 24, 2005 || Kitt Peak || Spacewatch || — || align=right | 2.8 km || 
|-id=405 bgcolor=#d6d6d6
| 308405 ||  || — || September 24, 2005 || Kitt Peak || Spacewatch || THM || align=right | 2.2 km || 
|-id=406 bgcolor=#d6d6d6
| 308406 ||  || — || September 24, 2005 || Kitt Peak || Spacewatch || THM || align=right | 2.1 km || 
|-id=407 bgcolor=#d6d6d6
| 308407 ||  || — || September 24, 2005 || Kitt Peak || Spacewatch || EOS || align=right | 2.1 km || 
|-id=408 bgcolor=#fefefe
| 308408 ||  || — || September 24, 2005 || Kitt Peak || Spacewatch || V || align=right data-sort-value="0.67" | 670 m || 
|-id=409 bgcolor=#d6d6d6
| 308409 ||  || — || September 24, 2005 || Kitt Peak || Spacewatch || — || align=right | 3.1 km || 
|-id=410 bgcolor=#d6d6d6
| 308410 ||  || — || April 9, 2003 || Palomar || NEAT || — || align=right | 4.2 km || 
|-id=411 bgcolor=#d6d6d6
| 308411 ||  || — || September 25, 2005 || Kitt Peak || Spacewatch || — || align=right | 3.1 km || 
|-id=412 bgcolor=#E9E9E9
| 308412 ||  || — || September 25, 2005 || Palomar || NEAT || — || align=right | 1.2 km || 
|-id=413 bgcolor=#E9E9E9
| 308413 ||  || — || September 25, 2005 || Kitt Peak || Spacewatch || EUN || align=right | 1.5 km || 
|-id=414 bgcolor=#d6d6d6
| 308414 ||  || — || September 26, 2005 || Kitt Peak || Spacewatch || — || align=right | 4.0 km || 
|-id=415 bgcolor=#d6d6d6
| 308415 ||  || — || September 26, 2005 || Palomar || NEAT || — || align=right | 3.8 km || 
|-id=416 bgcolor=#E9E9E9
| 308416 ||  || — || September 27, 2005 || Kitt Peak || Spacewatch || — || align=right data-sort-value="0.90" | 900 m || 
|-id=417 bgcolor=#E9E9E9
| 308417 ||  || — || September 27, 2005 || Kitt Peak || Spacewatch || — || align=right | 1.7 km || 
|-id=418 bgcolor=#d6d6d6
| 308418 ||  || — || September 28, 2005 || Palomar || NEAT || HYG || align=right | 3.3 km || 
|-id=419 bgcolor=#d6d6d6
| 308419 ||  || — || September 29, 2005 || Kitt Peak || Spacewatch || VER || align=right | 5.7 km || 
|-id=420 bgcolor=#d6d6d6
| 308420 ||  || — || September 29, 2005 || Mount Lemmon || Mount Lemmon Survey || — || align=right | 4.9 km || 
|-id=421 bgcolor=#d6d6d6
| 308421 ||  || — || September 29, 2005 || Mount Lemmon || Mount Lemmon Survey || THM || align=right | 2.2 km || 
|-id=422 bgcolor=#d6d6d6
| 308422 ||  || — || September 29, 2005 || Mount Lemmon || Mount Lemmon Survey || THM || align=right | 2.4 km || 
|-id=423 bgcolor=#d6d6d6
| 308423 ||  || — || September 29, 2005 || Mount Lemmon || Mount Lemmon Survey || — || align=right | 4.5 km || 
|-id=424 bgcolor=#d6d6d6
| 308424 ||  || — || September 29, 2005 || Anderson Mesa || LONEOS || — || align=right | 4.0 km || 
|-id=425 bgcolor=#d6d6d6
| 308425 ||  || — || September 24, 2005 || Kitt Peak || Spacewatch || HYG || align=right | 2.9 km || 
|-id=426 bgcolor=#d6d6d6
| 308426 ||  || — || September 25, 2005 || Kitt Peak || Spacewatch || THM || align=right | 2.3 km || 
|-id=427 bgcolor=#d6d6d6
| 308427 ||  || — || September 25, 2005 || Kitt Peak || Spacewatch || — || align=right | 3.5 km || 
|-id=428 bgcolor=#d6d6d6
| 308428 ||  || — || September 25, 2005 || Kitt Peak || Spacewatch || — || align=right | 2.4 km || 
|-id=429 bgcolor=#d6d6d6
| 308429 ||  || — || September 25, 2005 || Kitt Peak || Spacewatch || HYG || align=right | 3.1 km || 
|-id=430 bgcolor=#d6d6d6
| 308430 ||  || — || September 25, 2005 || Kitt Peak || Spacewatch || — || align=right | 3.7 km || 
|-id=431 bgcolor=#E9E9E9
| 308431 ||  || — || September 26, 2005 || Palomar || NEAT || — || align=right | 1.7 km || 
|-id=432 bgcolor=#d6d6d6
| 308432 ||  || — || September 26, 2005 || Palomar || NEAT || — || align=right | 3.7 km || 
|-id=433 bgcolor=#d6d6d6
| 308433 ||  || — || September 26, 2005 || Kitt Peak || Spacewatch || — || align=right | 3.5 km || 
|-id=434 bgcolor=#d6d6d6
| 308434 ||  || — || September 26, 2005 || Kitt Peak || Spacewatch || EOS || align=right | 2.5 km || 
|-id=435 bgcolor=#fefefe
| 308435 ||  || — || September 26, 2005 || Kitt Peak || Spacewatch || V || align=right data-sort-value="0.98" | 980 m || 
|-id=436 bgcolor=#fefefe
| 308436 ||  || — || September 27, 2005 || Kitt Peak || Spacewatch || — || align=right | 1.3 km || 
|-id=437 bgcolor=#d6d6d6
| 308437 ||  || — || September 27, 2005 || Kitt Peak || Spacewatch || — || align=right | 3.3 km || 
|-id=438 bgcolor=#d6d6d6
| 308438 ||  || — || September 29, 2005 || Kitt Peak || Spacewatch || — || align=right | 3.4 km || 
|-id=439 bgcolor=#d6d6d6
| 308439 ||  || — || September 29, 2005 || Palomar || NEAT || THM || align=right | 2.7 km || 
|-id=440 bgcolor=#d6d6d6
| 308440 ||  || — || September 29, 2005 || Kitt Peak || Spacewatch || — || align=right | 3.4 km || 
|-id=441 bgcolor=#d6d6d6
| 308441 ||  || — || September 29, 2005 || Kitt Peak || Spacewatch || — || align=right | 3.7 km || 
|-id=442 bgcolor=#d6d6d6
| 308442 ||  || — || September 29, 2005 || Anderson Mesa || LONEOS || URS || align=right | 4.2 km || 
|-id=443 bgcolor=#fefefe
| 308443 ||  || — || September 30, 2005 || Mount Lemmon || Mount Lemmon Survey || H || align=right data-sort-value="0.74" | 740 m || 
|-id=444 bgcolor=#d6d6d6
| 308444 ||  || — || September 30, 2005 || Mount Lemmon || Mount Lemmon Survey || — || align=right | 2.7 km || 
|-id=445 bgcolor=#d6d6d6
| 308445 ||  || — || September 30, 2005 || Kitt Peak || Spacewatch || — || align=right | 3.5 km || 
|-id=446 bgcolor=#d6d6d6
| 308446 ||  || — || September 30, 2005 || Mount Lemmon || Mount Lemmon Survey || THM || align=right | 2.3 km || 
|-id=447 bgcolor=#d6d6d6
| 308447 ||  || — || September 30, 2005 || Anderson Mesa || LONEOS || ALA || align=right | 5.0 km || 
|-id=448 bgcolor=#d6d6d6
| 308448 ||  || — || September 30, 2005 || Mount Lemmon || Mount Lemmon Survey || HYG || align=right | 3.0 km || 
|-id=449 bgcolor=#d6d6d6
| 308449 ||  || — || September 30, 2005 || Mount Lemmon || Mount Lemmon Survey || HYG || align=right | 2.7 km || 
|-id=450 bgcolor=#d6d6d6
| 308450 ||  || — || September 30, 2005 || Kitt Peak || Spacewatch || — || align=right | 2.8 km || 
|-id=451 bgcolor=#d6d6d6
| 308451 ||  || — || September 30, 2005 || Mount Lemmon || Mount Lemmon Survey || HYG || align=right | 2.9 km || 
|-id=452 bgcolor=#d6d6d6
| 308452 ||  || — || September 30, 2005 || Kitt Peak || Spacewatch || HYG || align=right | 2.8 km || 
|-id=453 bgcolor=#fefefe
| 308453 ||  || — || September 24, 2005 || Palomar || NEAT || ERI || align=right | 1.7 km || 
|-id=454 bgcolor=#d6d6d6
| 308454 ||  || — || September 22, 2005 || Palomar || NEAT || — || align=right | 3.1 km || 
|-id=455 bgcolor=#d6d6d6
| 308455 ||  || — || September 30, 2005 || Anderson Mesa || LONEOS || — || align=right | 3.5 km || 
|-id=456 bgcolor=#d6d6d6
| 308456 ||  || — || September 30, 2005 || Mount Lemmon || Mount Lemmon Survey || — || align=right | 3.0 km || 
|-id=457 bgcolor=#d6d6d6
| 308457 ||  || — || September 30, 2005 || Palomar || NEAT || HYG || align=right | 2.7 km || 
|-id=458 bgcolor=#d6d6d6
| 308458 ||  || — || September 27, 2005 || Kitt Peak || Spacewatch || — || align=right | 2.9 km || 
|-id=459 bgcolor=#d6d6d6
| 308459 ||  || — || September 30, 2005 || Mount Lemmon || Mount Lemmon Survey || — || align=right | 3.1 km || 
|-id=460 bgcolor=#C2E0FF
| 308460 ||  || — || September 22, 2005 || Apache Point || A. C. Becker, A. W. Puckett, J. Kubica || res4:5critical || align=right | 154 km || 
|-id=461 bgcolor=#d6d6d6
| 308461 ||  || — || September 25, 2005 || Apache Point || A. C. Becker || EOS || align=right | 4.2 km || 
|-id=462 bgcolor=#d6d6d6
| 308462 ||  || — || September 26, 2005 || Apache Point || A. C. Becker || — || align=right | 3.9 km || 
|-id=463 bgcolor=#d6d6d6
| 308463 ||  || — || September 26, 2005 || Apache Point || A. C. Becker || — || align=right | 3.5 km || 
|-id=464 bgcolor=#d6d6d6
| 308464 ||  || — || September 30, 2005 || Apache Point || A. C. Becker || — || align=right | 7.0 km || 
|-id=465 bgcolor=#d6d6d6
| 308465 ||  || — || September 23, 2005 || Kitt Peak || Spacewatch || — || align=right | 2.9 km || 
|-id=466 bgcolor=#d6d6d6
| 308466 ||  || — || September 26, 2005 || Palomar || NEAT || — || align=right | 3.6 km || 
|-id=467 bgcolor=#d6d6d6
| 308467 ||  || — || October 1, 2005 || Catalina || CSS || — || align=right | 3.9 km || 
|-id=468 bgcolor=#d6d6d6
| 308468 ||  || — || October 1, 2005 || Anderson Mesa || LONEOS || URS || align=right | 3.9 km || 
|-id=469 bgcolor=#d6d6d6
| 308469 ||  || — || October 1, 2005 || Kitt Peak || Spacewatch || THM || align=right | 2.7 km || 
|-id=470 bgcolor=#d6d6d6
| 308470 ||  || — || October 2, 2005 || Palomar || NEAT || — || align=right | 5.0 km || 
|-id=471 bgcolor=#d6d6d6
| 308471 ||  || — || October 2, 2005 || Mount Lemmon || Mount Lemmon Survey || CHA || align=right | 2.8 km || 
|-id=472 bgcolor=#d6d6d6
| 308472 ||  || — || October 1, 2005 || Kitt Peak || Spacewatch || EOS || align=right | 1.8 km || 
|-id=473 bgcolor=#d6d6d6
| 308473 ||  || — || October 1, 2005 || Kitt Peak || Spacewatch || EUP || align=right | 3.2 km || 
|-id=474 bgcolor=#d6d6d6
| 308474 ||  || — || October 3, 2005 || Catalina || CSS || — || align=right | 4.8 km || 
|-id=475 bgcolor=#d6d6d6
| 308475 ||  || — || October 1, 2005 || Catalina || CSS || — || align=right | 3.5 km || 
|-id=476 bgcolor=#d6d6d6
| 308476 ||  || — || October 2, 2005 || Anderson Mesa || LONEOS || — || align=right | 4.2 km || 
|-id=477 bgcolor=#d6d6d6
| 308477 ||  || — || October 5, 2005 || Mount Lemmon || Mount Lemmon Survey || THM || align=right | 2.6 km || 
|-id=478 bgcolor=#d6d6d6
| 308478 ||  || — || October 3, 2005 || Catalina || CSS || — || align=right | 3.1 km || 
|-id=479 bgcolor=#d6d6d6
| 308479 ||  || — || October 3, 2005 || Catalina || CSS || — || align=right | 3.3 km || 
|-id=480 bgcolor=#d6d6d6
| 308480 ||  || — || October 3, 2005 || Kitt Peak || Spacewatch || 7:4 || align=right | 6.4 km || 
|-id=481 bgcolor=#d6d6d6
| 308481 ||  || — || October 7, 2005 || Anderson Mesa || LONEOS || URS || align=right | 4.7 km || 
|-id=482 bgcolor=#d6d6d6
| 308482 ||  || — || October 1, 2005 || Mount Lemmon || Mount Lemmon Survey || — || align=right | 4.2 km || 
|-id=483 bgcolor=#E9E9E9
| 308483 ||  || — || October 6, 2005 || Catalina || CSS || JUN || align=right | 1.2 km || 
|-id=484 bgcolor=#E9E9E9
| 308484 ||  || — || October 7, 2005 || Catalina || CSS || — || align=right | 1.4 km || 
|-id=485 bgcolor=#d6d6d6
| 308485 ||  || — || October 3, 2005 || Kitt Peak || Spacewatch || HYG || align=right | 2.4 km || 
|-id=486 bgcolor=#d6d6d6
| 308486 ||  || — || October 5, 2005 || Kitt Peak || Spacewatch || — || align=right | 3.8 km || 
|-id=487 bgcolor=#fefefe
| 308487 ||  || — || October 6, 2005 || Catalina || CSS || V || align=right data-sort-value="0.92" | 920 m || 
|-id=488 bgcolor=#d6d6d6
| 308488 ||  || — || October 6, 2005 || Kitt Peak || Spacewatch || URS || align=right | 4.0 km || 
|-id=489 bgcolor=#d6d6d6
| 308489 ||  || — || October 7, 2005 || Mount Lemmon || Mount Lemmon Survey || — || align=right | 3.0 km || 
|-id=490 bgcolor=#d6d6d6
| 308490 ||  || — || October 7, 2005 || Mount Lemmon || Mount Lemmon Survey || — || align=right | 3.9 km || 
|-id=491 bgcolor=#d6d6d6
| 308491 ||  || — || October 9, 2005 || Kitt Peak || Spacewatch || EUP || align=right | 4.1 km || 
|-id=492 bgcolor=#d6d6d6
| 308492 ||  || — || October 4, 2005 || Mount Lemmon || Mount Lemmon Survey || — || align=right | 3.0 km || 
|-id=493 bgcolor=#d6d6d6
| 308493 ||  || — || October 7, 2005 || Kitt Peak || Spacewatch || VER || align=right | 2.9 km || 
|-id=494 bgcolor=#d6d6d6
| 308494 ||  || — || October 7, 2005 || Kitt Peak || Spacewatch || CHA || align=right | 2.6 km || 
|-id=495 bgcolor=#d6d6d6
| 308495 ||  || — || September 27, 2005 || Kitt Peak || Spacewatch || VER || align=right | 3.2 km || 
|-id=496 bgcolor=#d6d6d6
| 308496 ||  || — || October 7, 2005 || Kitt Peak || Spacewatch || — || align=right | 3.3 km || 
|-id=497 bgcolor=#E9E9E9
| 308497 ||  || — || October 7, 2005 || Kitt Peak || Spacewatch || — || align=right | 1.1 km || 
|-id=498 bgcolor=#d6d6d6
| 308498 ||  || — || October 7, 2005 || Kitt Peak || Spacewatch || THM || align=right | 2.5 km || 
|-id=499 bgcolor=#d6d6d6
| 308499 ||  || — || October 7, 2005 || Kitt Peak || Spacewatch || — || align=right | 2.9 km || 
|-id=500 bgcolor=#d6d6d6
| 308500 ||  || — || October 8, 2005 || Kitt Peak || Spacewatch || — || align=right | 3.7 km || 
|}

308501–308600 

|-bgcolor=#d6d6d6
| 308501 ||  || — || October 9, 2005 || Kitt Peak || Spacewatch || — || align=right | 3.6 km || 
|-id=502 bgcolor=#d6d6d6
| 308502 ||  || — || October 10, 2005 || Catalina || CSS || — || align=right | 4.8 km || 
|-id=503 bgcolor=#d6d6d6
| 308503 ||  || — || October 3, 2005 || Catalina || CSS || — || align=right | 4.0 km || 
|-id=504 bgcolor=#d6d6d6
| 308504 ||  || — || October 1, 2005 || Kitt Peak || Spacewatch || — || align=right | 2.6 km || 
|-id=505 bgcolor=#d6d6d6
| 308505 ||  || — || October 4, 2005 || Mount Lemmon || Mount Lemmon Survey || THM || align=right | 2.7 km || 
|-id=506 bgcolor=#d6d6d6
| 308506 ||  || — || October 5, 2005 || Catalina || CSS || — || align=right | 4.3 km || 
|-id=507 bgcolor=#d6d6d6
| 308507 ||  || — || October 26, 2005 || Ottmarsheim || C. Rinner || — || align=right | 3.8 km || 
|-id=508 bgcolor=#d6d6d6
| 308508 ||  || — || October 22, 2005 || Kitt Peak || Spacewatch || — || align=right | 3.3 km || 
|-id=509 bgcolor=#d6d6d6
| 308509 ||  || — || October 22, 2005 || Catalina || CSS || — || align=right | 4.0 km || 
|-id=510 bgcolor=#d6d6d6
| 308510 ||  || — || October 22, 2005 || Catalina || CSS || EUP || align=right | 3.9 km || 
|-id=511 bgcolor=#d6d6d6
| 308511 ||  || — || October 22, 2005 || Catalina || CSS || HYG || align=right | 3.3 km || 
|-id=512 bgcolor=#d6d6d6
| 308512 ||  || — || October 23, 2005 || Catalina || CSS || — || align=right | 4.3 km || 
|-id=513 bgcolor=#d6d6d6
| 308513 ||  || — || October 24, 2005 || Kitt Peak || Spacewatch || — || align=right | 3.5 km || 
|-id=514 bgcolor=#d6d6d6
| 308514 ||  || — || October 24, 2005 || Kitt Peak || Spacewatch || — || align=right | 4.6 km || 
|-id=515 bgcolor=#d6d6d6
| 308515 ||  || — || October 24, 2005 || Kitt Peak || Spacewatch || VER || align=right | 3.3 km || 
|-id=516 bgcolor=#d6d6d6
| 308516 ||  || — || October 24, 2005 || Kitt Peak || Spacewatch || — || align=right | 2.7 km || 
|-id=517 bgcolor=#d6d6d6
| 308517 ||  || — || October 22, 2005 || Kitt Peak || Spacewatch || — || align=right | 4.1 km || 
|-id=518 bgcolor=#d6d6d6
| 308518 ||  || — || October 22, 2005 || Kitt Peak || Spacewatch || — || align=right | 5.9 km || 
|-id=519 bgcolor=#E9E9E9
| 308519 ||  || — || October 23, 2005 || Catalina || CSS || — || align=right | 2.0 km || 
|-id=520 bgcolor=#d6d6d6
| 308520 ||  || — || October 23, 2005 || Catalina || CSS || — || align=right | 4.0 km || 
|-id=521 bgcolor=#d6d6d6
| 308521 ||  || — || October 23, 2005 || Catalina || CSS || — || align=right | 5.0 km || 
|-id=522 bgcolor=#d6d6d6
| 308522 ||  || — || October 21, 2005 || Palomar || NEAT || ALA || align=right | 4.6 km || 
|-id=523 bgcolor=#d6d6d6
| 308523 ||  || — || October 24, 2005 || Palomar || NEAT || URS || align=right | 3.6 km || 
|-id=524 bgcolor=#E9E9E9
| 308524 ||  || — || October 24, 2005 || Palomar || NEAT || — || align=right | 3.9 km || 
|-id=525 bgcolor=#d6d6d6
| 308525 ||  || — || October 22, 2005 || Kitt Peak || Spacewatch || — || align=right | 3.2 km || 
|-id=526 bgcolor=#d6d6d6
| 308526 ||  || — || October 22, 2005 || Kitt Peak || Spacewatch || — || align=right | 2.9 km || 
|-id=527 bgcolor=#d6d6d6
| 308527 ||  || — || October 22, 2005 || Kitt Peak || Spacewatch || VER || align=right | 3.8 km || 
|-id=528 bgcolor=#d6d6d6
| 308528 ||  || — || October 22, 2005 || Kitt Peak || Spacewatch || HYG || align=right | 2.4 km || 
|-id=529 bgcolor=#d6d6d6
| 308529 ||  || — || October 22, 2005 || Catalina || CSS || — || align=right | 3.5 km || 
|-id=530 bgcolor=#d6d6d6
| 308530 ||  || — || October 22, 2005 || Kitt Peak || Spacewatch || HYG || align=right | 2.9 km || 
|-id=531 bgcolor=#d6d6d6
| 308531 ||  || — || October 24, 2005 || Kitt Peak || Spacewatch || URS || align=right | 4.7 km || 
|-id=532 bgcolor=#d6d6d6
| 308532 ||  || — || October 24, 2005 || Kitt Peak || Spacewatch || — || align=right | 3.3 km || 
|-id=533 bgcolor=#d6d6d6
| 308533 ||  || — || October 24, 2005 || Kitt Peak || Spacewatch || — || align=right | 3.2 km || 
|-id=534 bgcolor=#d6d6d6
| 308534 ||  || — || October 25, 2005 || Kitt Peak || Spacewatch || — || align=right | 4.0 km || 
|-id=535 bgcolor=#E9E9E9
| 308535 ||  || — || October 25, 2005 || Catalina || CSS || — || align=right | 1.1 km || 
|-id=536 bgcolor=#fefefe
| 308536 ||  || — || October 26, 2005 || Mount Lemmon || Mount Lemmon Survey || — || align=right data-sort-value="0.98" | 980 m || 
|-id=537 bgcolor=#d6d6d6
| 308537 ||  || — || October 22, 2005 || Palomar || NEAT || HYG || align=right | 3.8 km || 
|-id=538 bgcolor=#E9E9E9
| 308538 ||  || — || October 24, 2005 || Kitt Peak || Spacewatch || — || align=right | 2.3 km || 
|-id=539 bgcolor=#E9E9E9
| 308539 ||  || — || October 24, 2005 || Kitt Peak || Spacewatch || — || align=right | 3.1 km || 
|-id=540 bgcolor=#d6d6d6
| 308540 ||  || — || October 25, 2005 || Kitt Peak || Spacewatch || — || align=right | 3.0 km || 
|-id=541 bgcolor=#d6d6d6
| 308541 ||  || — || October 26, 2005 || Kitt Peak || Spacewatch || — || align=right | 3.2 km || 
|-id=542 bgcolor=#d6d6d6
| 308542 ||  || — || October 26, 2005 || Kitt Peak || Spacewatch || HYG || align=right | 3.2 km || 
|-id=543 bgcolor=#d6d6d6
| 308543 ||  || — || October 22, 2005 || Palomar || NEAT || EOS || align=right | 2.7 km || 
|-id=544 bgcolor=#d6d6d6
| 308544 ||  || — || October 25, 2005 || Kitt Peak || Spacewatch || — || align=right | 3.3 km || 
|-id=545 bgcolor=#E9E9E9
| 308545 ||  || — || October 25, 2005 || Mount Lemmon || Mount Lemmon Survey || — || align=right | 1.2 km || 
|-id=546 bgcolor=#d6d6d6
| 308546 ||  || — || October 25, 2005 || Kitt Peak || Spacewatch || EOS || align=right | 2.8 km || 
|-id=547 bgcolor=#d6d6d6
| 308547 ||  || — || October 25, 2005 || Kitt Peak || Spacewatch || HYG || align=right | 3.5 km || 
|-id=548 bgcolor=#d6d6d6
| 308548 ||  || — || October 25, 2005 || Catalina || CSS || — || align=right | 3.9 km || 
|-id=549 bgcolor=#d6d6d6
| 308549 ||  || — || October 25, 2005 || Kitt Peak || Spacewatch || HYG || align=right | 3.0 km || 
|-id=550 bgcolor=#d6d6d6
| 308550 ||  || — || October 25, 2005 || Kitt Peak || Spacewatch || — || align=right | 3.4 km || 
|-id=551 bgcolor=#d6d6d6
| 308551 ||  || — || October 27, 2005 || Kitt Peak || Spacewatch || — || align=right | 3.5 km || 
|-id=552 bgcolor=#d6d6d6
| 308552 ||  || — || October 26, 2005 || Kitt Peak || Spacewatch || THM || align=right | 2.6 km || 
|-id=553 bgcolor=#d6d6d6
| 308553 ||  || — || October 26, 2005 || Kitt Peak || Spacewatch || — || align=right | 3.2 km || 
|-id=554 bgcolor=#d6d6d6
| 308554 ||  || — || October 27, 2005 || Mount Lemmon || Mount Lemmon Survey || VER || align=right | 4.0 km || 
|-id=555 bgcolor=#d6d6d6
| 308555 ||  || — || April 5, 2003 || Kitt Peak || Spacewatch || — || align=right | 4.1 km || 
|-id=556 bgcolor=#d6d6d6
| 308556 ||  || — || October 28, 2005 || Catalina || CSS || TIR || align=right | 3.9 km || 
|-id=557 bgcolor=#d6d6d6
| 308557 ||  || — || October 28, 2005 || Catalina || CSS || EOS || align=right | 2.7 km || 
|-id=558 bgcolor=#d6d6d6
| 308558 ||  || — || October 28, 2005 || Catalina || CSS || — || align=right | 4.3 km || 
|-id=559 bgcolor=#fefefe
| 308559 ||  || — || October 27, 2005 || Kitt Peak || Spacewatch || V || align=right data-sort-value="0.92" | 920 m || 
|-id=560 bgcolor=#d6d6d6
| 308560 ||  || — || October 29, 2005 || Mount Lemmon || Mount Lemmon Survey || — || align=right | 2.4 km || 
|-id=561 bgcolor=#E9E9E9
| 308561 ||  || — || October 29, 2005 || Palomar || NEAT || MAR || align=right | 1.3 km || 
|-id=562 bgcolor=#d6d6d6
| 308562 ||  || — || October 30, 2005 || Kitt Peak || Spacewatch || — || align=right | 3.5 km || 
|-id=563 bgcolor=#d6d6d6
| 308563 ||  || — || October 23, 2005 || Catalina || CSS || ALA || align=right | 4.1 km || 
|-id=564 bgcolor=#d6d6d6
| 308564 ||  || — || October 23, 2005 || Palomar || NEAT || — || align=right | 4.5 km || 
|-id=565 bgcolor=#d6d6d6
| 308565 ||  || — || October 27, 2005 || Kitt Peak || Spacewatch || — || align=right | 4.3 km || 
|-id=566 bgcolor=#E9E9E9
| 308566 ||  || — || October 27, 2005 || Mount Lemmon || Mount Lemmon Survey || — || align=right | 1.00 km || 
|-id=567 bgcolor=#d6d6d6
| 308567 ||  || — || October 26, 2005 || Mount Lemmon || Mount Lemmon Survey || — || align=right | 2.7 km || 
|-id=568 bgcolor=#d6d6d6
| 308568 ||  || — || October 27, 2005 || Catalina || CSS || — || align=right | 4.6 km || 
|-id=569 bgcolor=#fefefe
| 308569 ||  || — || October 31, 2005 || Anderson Mesa || LONEOS || V || align=right data-sort-value="0.99" | 990 m || 
|-id=570 bgcolor=#d6d6d6
| 308570 ||  || — || October 28, 2005 || Catalina || CSS || THM || align=right | 2.7 km || 
|-id=571 bgcolor=#fefefe
| 308571 ||  || — || October 29, 2005 || Mount Lemmon || Mount Lemmon Survey || FLO || align=right data-sort-value="0.80" | 800 m || 
|-id=572 bgcolor=#d6d6d6
| 308572 ||  || — || October 25, 2005 || Kitt Peak || Spacewatch || — || align=right | 3.0 km || 
|-id=573 bgcolor=#d6d6d6
| 308573 ||  || — || October 27, 2005 || Mount Lemmon || Mount Lemmon Survey || — || align=right | 4.6 km || 
|-id=574 bgcolor=#d6d6d6
| 308574 ||  || — || October 28, 2005 || Kitt Peak || Spacewatch || — || align=right | 2.5 km || 
|-id=575 bgcolor=#d6d6d6
| 308575 ||  || — || October 29, 2005 || Mount Lemmon || Mount Lemmon Survey || — || align=right | 2.7 km || 
|-id=576 bgcolor=#d6d6d6
| 308576 ||  || — || October 27, 2005 || Mount Lemmon || Mount Lemmon Survey || ULA7:4 || align=right | 6.4 km || 
|-id=577 bgcolor=#d6d6d6
| 308577 ||  || — || October 29, 2005 || Catalina || CSS || — || align=right | 4.6 km || 
|-id=578 bgcolor=#d6d6d6
| 308578 ||  || — || October 30, 2005 || Kitt Peak || Spacewatch || — || align=right | 2.8 km || 
|-id=579 bgcolor=#d6d6d6
| 308579 ||  || — || October 27, 2005 || Palomar || NEAT || HYG || align=right | 3.6 km || 
|-id=580 bgcolor=#d6d6d6
| 308580 ||  || — || October 27, 2005 || Mount Lemmon || Mount Lemmon Survey || VER || align=right | 3.0 km || 
|-id=581 bgcolor=#d6d6d6
| 308581 ||  || — || October 22, 2005 || Palomar || NEAT || — || align=right | 4.5 km || 
|-id=582 bgcolor=#d6d6d6
| 308582 ||  || — || October 23, 2005 || Palomar || NEAT || — || align=right | 3.0 km || 
|-id=583 bgcolor=#d6d6d6
| 308583 ||  || — || October 23, 2005 || Palomar || NEAT || — || align=right | 4.6 km || 
|-id=584 bgcolor=#d6d6d6
| 308584 ||  || — || October 23, 2005 || Catalina || CSS || EOS || align=right | 2.7 km || 
|-id=585 bgcolor=#d6d6d6
| 308585 ||  || — || October 20, 2005 || Apache Point || A. C. Becker || — || align=right | 2.8 km || 
|-id=586 bgcolor=#d6d6d6
| 308586 ||  || — || October 22, 2005 || Apache Point || A. C. Becker || — || align=right | 3.4 km || 
|-id=587 bgcolor=#d6d6d6
| 308587 ||  || — || October 25, 2005 || Apache Point || A. C. Becker || — || align=right | 2.7 km || 
|-id=588 bgcolor=#d6d6d6
| 308588 ||  || — || October 26, 2005 || Apache Point || A. C. Becker || EOS || align=right | 3.0 km || 
|-id=589 bgcolor=#d6d6d6
| 308589 ||  || — || October 26, 2005 || Apache Point || A. C. Becker || — || align=right | 3.8 km || 
|-id=590 bgcolor=#d6d6d6
| 308590 ||  || — || October 27, 2005 || Apache Point || A. C. Becker || — || align=right | 3.2 km || 
|-id=591 bgcolor=#E9E9E9
| 308591 ||  || — || October 25, 2005 || Mount Lemmon || Mount Lemmon Survey || — || align=right data-sort-value="0.94" | 940 m || 
|-id=592 bgcolor=#d6d6d6
| 308592 ||  || — || November 6, 2005 || Silver Spring || Silver Spring Obs. || — || align=right | 5.2 km || 
|-id=593 bgcolor=#d6d6d6
| 308593 ||  || — || November 4, 2005 || Kitt Peak || Spacewatch || THM || align=right | 2.6 km || 
|-id=594 bgcolor=#d6d6d6
| 308594 ||  || — || November 3, 2005 || Catalina || CSS || URS || align=right | 4.9 km || 
|-id=595 bgcolor=#d6d6d6
| 308595 ||  || — || November 5, 2005 || Kitt Peak || Spacewatch || — || align=right | 3.8 km || 
|-id=596 bgcolor=#d6d6d6
| 308596 ||  || — || November 4, 2005 || Catalina || CSS || — || align=right | 3.5 km || 
|-id=597 bgcolor=#d6d6d6
| 308597 ||  || — || November 7, 2005 || Socorro || LINEAR || ALA || align=right | 6.3 km || 
|-id=598 bgcolor=#d6d6d6
| 308598 ||  || — || November 1, 2005 || Mount Lemmon || Mount Lemmon Survey || — || align=right | 4.4 km || 
|-id=599 bgcolor=#d6d6d6
| 308599 ||  || — || November 5, 2005 || Mount Lemmon || Mount Lemmon Survey || — || align=right | 3.2 km || 
|-id=600 bgcolor=#d6d6d6
| 308600 ||  || — || November 4, 2005 || Mount Lemmon || Mount Lemmon Survey || — || align=right | 4.4 km || 
|}

308601–308700 

|-bgcolor=#d6d6d6
| 308601 ||  || — || November 5, 2005 || Kitt Peak || Spacewatch || HYG || align=right | 3.3 km || 
|-id=602 bgcolor=#d6d6d6
| 308602 ||  || — || November 6, 2005 || Mount Lemmon || Mount Lemmon Survey || — || align=right | 3.1 km || 
|-id=603 bgcolor=#d6d6d6
| 308603 ||  || — || November 6, 2005 || Mount Lemmon || Mount Lemmon Survey || HYG || align=right | 2.5 km || 
|-id=604 bgcolor=#FA8072
| 308604 ||  || — || November 10, 2005 || Kitt Peak || Spacewatch || — || align=right data-sort-value="0.33" | 330 m || 
|-id=605 bgcolor=#d6d6d6
| 308605 ||  || — || November 5, 2005 || Mount Lemmon || Mount Lemmon Survey || EOS || align=right | 2.2 km || 
|-id=606 bgcolor=#d6d6d6
| 308606 ||  || — || November 1, 2005 || Apache Point || A. C. Becker || — || align=right | 2.5 km || 
|-id=607 bgcolor=#C7FF8F
| 308607 ||  || — || November 21, 2005 || Kitt Peak || Spacewatch || unusualcritical || align=right | 8.8 km || 
|-id=608 bgcolor=#d6d6d6
| 308608 ||  || — || November 20, 2005 || Palomar || NEAT || — || align=right | 4.9 km || 
|-id=609 bgcolor=#E9E9E9
| 308609 ||  || — || November 21, 2005 || Kitt Peak || Spacewatch || — || align=right | 1.3 km || 
|-id=610 bgcolor=#fefefe
| 308610 ||  || — || November 25, 2005 || Mount Lemmon || Mount Lemmon Survey || H || align=right data-sort-value="0.91" | 910 m || 
|-id=611 bgcolor=#d6d6d6
| 308611 ||  || — || November 26, 2005 || Catalina || CSS || — || align=right | 5.1 km || 
|-id=612 bgcolor=#E9E9E9
| 308612 ||  || — || November 28, 2005 || Catalina || CSS || — || align=right | 1.3 km || 
|-id=613 bgcolor=#d6d6d6
| 308613 ||  || — || November 29, 2005 || Catalina || CSS || Tj (2.97) || align=right | 5.5 km || 
|-id=614 bgcolor=#d6d6d6
| 308614 ||  || — || November 30, 2005 || Mount Lemmon || Mount Lemmon Survey || — || align=right | 3.5 km || 
|-id=615 bgcolor=#d6d6d6
| 308615 ||  || — || November 30, 2005 || Mount Lemmon || Mount Lemmon Survey || — || align=right | 3.2 km || 
|-id=616 bgcolor=#d6d6d6
| 308616 ||  || — || November 25, 2005 || Mount Lemmon || Mount Lemmon Survey || — || align=right | 3.8 km || 
|-id=617 bgcolor=#d6d6d6
| 308617 ||  || — || November 22, 2005 || Catalina || CSS || EMA || align=right | 4.2 km || 
|-id=618 bgcolor=#E9E9E9
| 308618 ||  || — || November 29, 2005 || Mount Lemmon || Mount Lemmon Survey || — || align=right | 2.8 km || 
|-id=619 bgcolor=#E9E9E9
| 308619 ||  || — || November 30, 2005 || Kitt Peak || Spacewatch || MIS || align=right | 2.4 km || 
|-id=620 bgcolor=#d6d6d6
| 308620 ||  || — || November 22, 2005 || Catalina || CSS || MEL || align=right | 5.0 km || 
|-id=621 bgcolor=#E9E9E9
| 308621 ||  || — || November 28, 2005 || Catalina || CSS || — || align=right | 1.2 km || 
|-id=622 bgcolor=#d6d6d6
| 308622 ||  || — || December 2, 2005 || Mayhill || A. Lowe || Tj (2.98) || align=right | 6.8 km || 
|-id=623 bgcolor=#d6d6d6
| 308623 ||  || — || December 1, 2005 || Kitt Peak || Spacewatch || VER || align=right | 4.5 km || 
|-id=624 bgcolor=#d6d6d6
| 308624 ||  || — || December 1, 2005 || Kitt Peak || Spacewatch || 7:4 || align=right | 4.4 km || 
|-id=625 bgcolor=#E9E9E9
| 308625 ||  || — || December 2, 2005 || Kitt Peak || Spacewatch || — || align=right | 1.9 km || 
|-id=626 bgcolor=#E9E9E9
| 308626 ||  || — || December 1, 2005 || Palomar || NEAT || — || align=right | 3.2 km || 
|-id=627 bgcolor=#d6d6d6
| 308627 ||  || — || December 2, 2005 || Kitt Peak || Spacewatch || 7:4 || align=right | 7.1 km || 
|-id=628 bgcolor=#d6d6d6
| 308628 ||  || — || December 2, 2005 || Kitt Peak || Spacewatch || TIR || align=right | 4.6 km || 
|-id=629 bgcolor=#d6d6d6
| 308629 ||  || — || December 4, 2005 || Kitt Peak || Spacewatch || — || align=right | 3.8 km || 
|-id=630 bgcolor=#E9E9E9
| 308630 ||  || — || December 5, 2005 || Kitt Peak || Spacewatch || — || align=right | 3.1 km || 
|-id=631 bgcolor=#E9E9E9
| 308631 ||  || — || December 4, 2005 || Catalina || CSS || — || align=right | 1.2 km || 
|-id=632 bgcolor=#E9E9E9
| 308632 ||  || — || December 2, 2005 || Catalina || CSS || — || align=right | 1.6 km || 
|-id=633 bgcolor=#fefefe
| 308633 ||  || — || December 8, 2005 || Kitt Peak || Spacewatch || — || align=right data-sort-value="0.81" | 810 m || 
|-id=634 bgcolor=#C2E0FF
| 308634 ||  || — || December 1, 2005 || Kitt Peak || M. W. Buie || cubewano (hot)critical || align=right | 231 km || 
|-id=635 bgcolor=#FFC2E0
| 308635 ||  || — || December 28, 2005 || Steward Observatory || Spacewatch || APOPHA || align=right data-sort-value="0.4" | 400 m || 
|-id=636 bgcolor=#E9E9E9
| 308636 ||  || — || December 21, 2005 || Kitt Peak || Spacewatch || — || align=right | 1.0 km || 
|-id=637 bgcolor=#fefefe
| 308637 ||  || — || December 25, 2005 || Kitt Peak || Spacewatch || — || align=right | 1.2 km || 
|-id=638 bgcolor=#fefefe
| 308638 ||  || — || December 26, 2005 || Kitt Peak || Spacewatch || — || align=right data-sort-value="0.84" | 840 m || 
|-id=639 bgcolor=#d6d6d6
| 308639 ||  || — || December 25, 2005 || Mount Lemmon || Mount Lemmon Survey || EUP || align=right | 5.6 km || 
|-id=640 bgcolor=#fefefe
| 308640 ||  || — || December 25, 2005 || Kitt Peak || Spacewatch || — || align=right data-sort-value="0.63" | 630 m || 
|-id=641 bgcolor=#fefefe
| 308641 ||  || — || December 22, 2005 || Kitt Peak || Spacewatch || — || align=right data-sort-value="0.90" | 900 m || 
|-id=642 bgcolor=#E9E9E9
| 308642 ||  || — || January 6, 2006 || Socorro || LINEAR || — || align=right | 1.6 km || 
|-id=643 bgcolor=#fefefe
| 308643 ||  || — || January 5, 2006 || Kitt Peak || Spacewatch || — || align=right data-sort-value="0.73" | 730 m || 
|-id=644 bgcolor=#fefefe
| 308644 ||  || — || January 7, 2006 || Mount Lemmon || Mount Lemmon Survey || — || align=right data-sort-value="0.56" | 560 m || 
|-id=645 bgcolor=#fefefe
| 308645 ||  || — || January 6, 2006 || Kitt Peak || Spacewatch || — || align=right data-sort-value="0.78" | 780 m || 
|-id=646 bgcolor=#d6d6d6
| 308646 ||  || — || January 19, 2006 || Catalina || CSS || — || align=right | 4.5 km || 
|-id=647 bgcolor=#fefefe
| 308647 ||  || — || January 20, 2006 || Catalina || CSS || H || align=right data-sort-value="0.80" | 800 m || 
|-id=648 bgcolor=#fefefe
| 308648 ||  || — || January 22, 2006 || Mount Lemmon || Mount Lemmon Survey || FLO || align=right data-sort-value="0.89" | 890 m || 
|-id=649 bgcolor=#fefefe
| 308649 ||  || — || January 23, 2006 || Mount Lemmon || Mount Lemmon Survey || — || align=right data-sort-value="0.88" | 880 m || 
|-id=650 bgcolor=#fefefe
| 308650 ||  || — || January 21, 2006 || Kitt Peak || Spacewatch || — || align=right | 1.1 km || 
|-id=651 bgcolor=#fefefe
| 308651 ||  || — || January 23, 2006 || Mount Lemmon || Mount Lemmon Survey || FLO || align=right data-sort-value="0.57" | 570 m || 
|-id=652 bgcolor=#fefefe
| 308652 ||  || — || January 25, 2006 || Kitt Peak || Spacewatch || — || align=right | 1.1 km || 
|-id=653 bgcolor=#E9E9E9
| 308653 ||  || — || January 22, 2006 || Catalina || CSS || — || align=right | 1.9 km || 
|-id=654 bgcolor=#fefefe
| 308654 ||  || — || January 23, 2006 || Kitt Peak || Spacewatch || — || align=right | 1.5 km || 
|-id=655 bgcolor=#E9E9E9
| 308655 ||  || — || January 26, 2006 || Kitt Peak || Spacewatch || — || align=right | 1.3 km || 
|-id=656 bgcolor=#fefefe
| 308656 ||  || — || January 23, 2006 || Mount Lemmon || Mount Lemmon Survey || — || align=right data-sort-value="0.70" | 700 m || 
|-id=657 bgcolor=#fefefe
| 308657 ||  || — || January 26, 2006 || Kitt Peak || Spacewatch || — || align=right data-sort-value="0.82" | 820 m || 
|-id=658 bgcolor=#fefefe
| 308658 ||  || — || January 26, 2006 || Mount Lemmon || Mount Lemmon Survey || — || align=right data-sort-value="0.52" | 520 m || 
|-id=659 bgcolor=#fefefe
| 308659 ||  || — || January 26, 2006 || Kitt Peak || Spacewatch || NYS || align=right data-sort-value="0.74" | 740 m || 
|-id=660 bgcolor=#C2FFFF
| 308660 ||  || — || January 28, 2006 || Mount Lemmon || Mount Lemmon Survey || L5 || align=right | 11 km || 
|-id=661 bgcolor=#fefefe
| 308661 ||  || — || January 25, 2006 || Kitt Peak || Spacewatch || NYS || align=right data-sort-value="0.65" | 650 m || 
|-id=662 bgcolor=#fefefe
| 308662 ||  || — || January 26, 2006 || Kitt Peak || Spacewatch || — || align=right data-sort-value="0.54" | 540 m || 
|-id=663 bgcolor=#fefefe
| 308663 ||  || — || January 27, 2006 || Mount Lemmon || Mount Lemmon Survey || FLO || align=right data-sort-value="0.69" | 690 m || 
|-id=664 bgcolor=#E9E9E9
| 308664 ||  || — || January 22, 2006 || Socorro || LINEAR || — || align=right | 1.4 km || 
|-id=665 bgcolor=#fefefe
| 308665 ||  || — || January 31, 2006 || Kitt Peak || Spacewatch || — || align=right data-sort-value="0.87" | 870 m || 
|-id=666 bgcolor=#fefefe
| 308666 ||  || — || January 31, 2006 || Kitt Peak || Spacewatch || — || align=right | 1.1 km || 
|-id=667 bgcolor=#fefefe
| 308667 ||  || — || January 27, 2006 || Catalina || CSS || PHO || align=right | 1.7 km || 
|-id=668 bgcolor=#fefefe
| 308668 ||  || — || January 27, 2006 || Kitt Peak || Spacewatch || — || align=right data-sort-value="0.67" | 670 m || 
|-id=669 bgcolor=#fefefe
| 308669 ||  || — || January 30, 2006 || Kitt Peak || Spacewatch || MAS || align=right data-sort-value="0.98" | 980 m || 
|-id=670 bgcolor=#fefefe
| 308670 ||  || — || January 26, 2006 || Kitt Peak || Spacewatch || V || align=right data-sort-value="0.87" | 870 m || 
|-id=671 bgcolor=#fefefe
| 308671 ||  || — || February 1, 2006 || Kitt Peak || Spacewatch || FLO || align=right data-sort-value="0.71" | 710 m || 
|-id=672 bgcolor=#fefefe
| 308672 ||  || — || February 4, 2006 || Mount Lemmon || Mount Lemmon Survey || — || align=right | 1.3 km || 
|-id=673 bgcolor=#d6d6d6
| 308673 ||  || — || February 20, 2006 || Catalina || CSS || — || align=right | 4.6 km || 
|-id=674 bgcolor=#fefefe
| 308674 ||  || — || February 20, 2006 || Catalina || CSS || — || align=right | 1.2 km || 
|-id=675 bgcolor=#E9E9E9
| 308675 ||  || — || February 21, 2006 || Catalina || CSS || — || align=right | 1.9 km || 
|-id=676 bgcolor=#fefefe
| 308676 ||  || — || February 20, 2006 || Mount Lemmon || Mount Lemmon Survey || — || align=right data-sort-value="0.71" | 710 m || 
|-id=677 bgcolor=#fefefe
| 308677 ||  || — || February 20, 2006 || Kitt Peak || Spacewatch || — || align=right data-sort-value="0.83" | 830 m || 
|-id=678 bgcolor=#fefefe
| 308678 ||  || — || February 24, 2006 || Kitt Peak || Spacewatch || — || align=right data-sort-value="0.82" | 820 m || 
|-id=679 bgcolor=#fefefe
| 308679 ||  || — || February 25, 2006 || Socorro || LINEAR || — || align=right | 1.1 km || 
|-id=680 bgcolor=#d6d6d6
| 308680 McLennan ||  ||  || February 25, 2006 || Mayhill || A. Lowe || Tj (2.9) || align=right | 6.9 km || 
|-id=681 bgcolor=#fefefe
| 308681 ||  || — || February 27, 2006 || Mayhill || A. Lowe || FLO || align=right data-sort-value="0.83" | 830 m || 
|-id=682 bgcolor=#fefefe
| 308682 ||  || — || February 24, 2006 || Kitt Peak || Spacewatch || — || align=right data-sort-value="0.84" | 840 m || 
|-id=683 bgcolor=#fefefe
| 308683 ||  || — || February 24, 2006 || Kitt Peak || Spacewatch || — || align=right | 1.1 km || 
|-id=684 bgcolor=#fefefe
| 308684 ||  || — || February 24, 2006 || Kitt Peak || Spacewatch || — || align=right data-sort-value="0.89" | 890 m || 
|-id=685 bgcolor=#fefefe
| 308685 ||  || — || February 25, 2006 || Kitt Peak || Spacewatch || NYS || align=right data-sort-value="0.70" | 700 m || 
|-id=686 bgcolor=#fefefe
| 308686 ||  || — || February 25, 2006 || Mount Lemmon || Mount Lemmon Survey || — || align=right data-sort-value="0.76" | 760 m || 
|-id=687 bgcolor=#fefefe
| 308687 ||  || — || February 25, 2006 || Mount Lemmon || Mount Lemmon Survey || NYS || align=right data-sort-value="0.82" | 820 m || 
|-id=688 bgcolor=#fefefe
| 308688 ||  || — || February 27, 2006 || Kitt Peak || Spacewatch || MAS || align=right data-sort-value="0.79" | 790 m || 
|-id=689 bgcolor=#fefefe
| 308689 ||  || — || February 27, 2006 || Kitt Peak || Spacewatch || — || align=right | 1.1 km || 
|-id=690 bgcolor=#fefefe
| 308690 ||  || — || February 25, 2006 || Mount Lemmon || Mount Lemmon Survey || — || align=right data-sort-value="0.90" | 900 m || 
|-id=691 bgcolor=#fefefe
| 308691 ||  || — || February 25, 2006 || Kitt Peak || Spacewatch || V || align=right data-sort-value="0.86" | 860 m || 
|-id=692 bgcolor=#fefefe
| 308692 ||  || — || February 25, 2006 || Kitt Peak || Spacewatch || — || align=right data-sort-value="0.80" | 800 m || 
|-id=693 bgcolor=#E9E9E9
| 308693 ||  || — || March 2, 2006 || Nyukasa || Mount Nyukasa Stn. || — || align=right | 1.9 km || 
|-id=694 bgcolor=#fefefe
| 308694 ||  || — || March 2, 2006 || Kitt Peak || Spacewatch || — || align=right data-sort-value="0.83" | 830 m || 
|-id=695 bgcolor=#fefefe
| 308695 ||  || — || March 2, 2006 || Kitt Peak || Spacewatch || MAS || align=right data-sort-value="0.85" | 850 m || 
|-id=696 bgcolor=#E9E9E9
| 308696 ||  || — || March 2, 2006 || Kitt Peak || Spacewatch || — || align=right | 1.1 km || 
|-id=697 bgcolor=#fefefe
| 308697 ||  || — || March 2, 2006 || Kitt Peak || Spacewatch || NYS || align=right data-sort-value="0.83" | 830 m || 
|-id=698 bgcolor=#FA8072
| 308698 ||  || — || March 26, 2006 || Reedy Creek || J. Broughton || — || align=right | 1.7 km || 
|-id=699 bgcolor=#fefefe
| 308699 ||  || — || March 23, 2006 || Mount Lemmon || Mount Lemmon Survey || — || align=right data-sort-value="0.87" | 870 m || 
|-id=700 bgcolor=#fefefe
| 308700 ||  || — || March 24, 2006 || Mount Lemmon || Mount Lemmon Survey || — || align=right | 1.2 km || 
|}

308701–308800 

|-bgcolor=#E9E9E9
| 308701 ||  || — || March 25, 2006 || Kitt Peak || Spacewatch || JUN || align=right | 1.2 km || 
|-id=702 bgcolor=#fefefe
| 308702 ||  || — || March 22, 2006 || Catalina || CSS || — || align=right data-sort-value="0.94" | 940 m || 
|-id=703 bgcolor=#fefefe
| 308703 ||  || — || March 24, 2006 || Mount Lemmon || Mount Lemmon Survey || — || align=right data-sort-value="0.80" | 800 m || 
|-id=704 bgcolor=#fefefe
| 308704 ||  || — || March 25, 2006 || Kitt Peak || Spacewatch || FLO || align=right data-sort-value="0.62" | 620 m || 
|-id=705 bgcolor=#fefefe
| 308705 ||  || — || March 23, 2006 || Catalina || CSS || — || align=right | 1.1 km || 
|-id=706 bgcolor=#fefefe
| 308706 ||  || — || March 25, 2006 || Catalina || CSS || PHO || align=right | 1.4 km || 
|-id=707 bgcolor=#E9E9E9
| 308707 ||  || — || March 29, 2006 || Socorro || LINEAR || — || align=right | 1.7 km || 
|-id=708 bgcolor=#E9E9E9
| 308708 ||  || — || April 2, 2006 || Kitt Peak || Spacewatch || — || align=right | 1.1 km || 
|-id=709 bgcolor=#fefefe
| 308709 ||  || — || April 2, 2006 || Kitt Peak || Spacewatch || — || align=right data-sort-value="0.90" | 900 m || 
|-id=710 bgcolor=#fefefe
| 308710 ||  || — || April 2, 2006 || Kitt Peak || Spacewatch || — || align=right data-sort-value="0.67" | 670 m || 
|-id=711 bgcolor=#E9E9E9
| 308711 ||  || — || April 2, 2006 || Kitt Peak || Spacewatch || — || align=right | 1.4 km || 
|-id=712 bgcolor=#fefefe
| 308712 ||  || — || April 2, 2006 || Kitt Peak || Spacewatch || MAS || align=right data-sort-value="0.78" | 780 m || 
|-id=713 bgcolor=#fefefe
| 308713 ||  || — || April 7, 2006 || Kitt Peak || Spacewatch || — || align=right data-sort-value="0.89" | 890 m || 
|-id=714 bgcolor=#E9E9E9
| 308714 ||  || — || April 7, 2006 || Socorro || LINEAR || RAF || align=right | 1.7 km || 
|-id=715 bgcolor=#fefefe
| 308715 ||  || — || April 8, 2006 || Kitt Peak || Spacewatch || NYS || align=right data-sort-value="0.75" | 750 m || 
|-id=716 bgcolor=#E9E9E9
| 308716 ||  || — || April 7, 2006 || Catalina || CSS || — || align=right | 1.4 km || 
|-id=717 bgcolor=#fefefe
| 308717 ||  || — || April 7, 2006 || Catalina || CSS || MAS || align=right data-sort-value="0.87" | 870 m || 
|-id=718 bgcolor=#fefefe
| 308718 ||  || — || April 9, 2006 || Kitt Peak || Spacewatch || FLO || align=right data-sort-value="0.66" | 660 m || 
|-id=719 bgcolor=#fefefe
| 308719 ||  || — || April 2, 2006 || Catalina || CSS || — || align=right | 1.2 km || 
|-id=720 bgcolor=#fefefe
| 308720 ||  || — || April 2, 2006 || Kitt Peak || Spacewatch || — || align=right data-sort-value="0.84" | 840 m || 
|-id=721 bgcolor=#fefefe
| 308721 ||  || — || April 18, 2006 || Palomar || NEAT || — || align=right data-sort-value="0.77" | 770 m || 
|-id=722 bgcolor=#fefefe
| 308722 ||  || — || April 23, 2006 || Piszkéstető || K. Sárneczky || FLO || align=right data-sort-value="0.62" | 620 m || 
|-id=723 bgcolor=#fefefe
| 308723 ||  || — || April 20, 2006 || Kitt Peak || Spacewatch || NYS || align=right data-sort-value="0.66" | 660 m || 
|-id=724 bgcolor=#fefefe
| 308724 ||  || — || April 20, 2006 || Kitt Peak || Spacewatch || — || align=right | 1.1 km || 
|-id=725 bgcolor=#fefefe
| 308725 ||  || — || April 20, 2006 || Kitt Peak || Spacewatch || V || align=right data-sort-value="0.90" | 900 m || 
|-id=726 bgcolor=#fefefe
| 308726 ||  || — || April 20, 2006 || Kitt Peak || Spacewatch || — || align=right | 1.2 km || 
|-id=727 bgcolor=#fefefe
| 308727 ||  || — || April 21, 2006 || Mount Lemmon || Mount Lemmon Survey || — || align=right data-sort-value="0.78" | 780 m || 
|-id=728 bgcolor=#fefefe
| 308728 ||  || — || April 20, 2006 || Catalina || CSS || NYS || align=right data-sort-value="0.82" | 820 m || 
|-id=729 bgcolor=#fefefe
| 308729 ||  || — || April 21, 2006 || Kitt Peak || Spacewatch || FLO || align=right data-sort-value="0.98" | 980 m || 
|-id=730 bgcolor=#fefefe
| 308730 ||  || — || April 24, 2006 || Mount Lemmon || Mount Lemmon Survey || V || align=right data-sort-value="0.97" | 970 m || 
|-id=731 bgcolor=#fefefe
| 308731 ||  || — || April 24, 2006 || Kitt Peak || Spacewatch || MAS || align=right data-sort-value="0.94" | 940 m || 
|-id=732 bgcolor=#fefefe
| 308732 ||  || — || April 25, 2006 || Kitt Peak || Spacewatch || — || align=right data-sort-value="0.80" | 800 m || 
|-id=733 bgcolor=#fefefe
| 308733 ||  || — || April 24, 2006 || Mount Lemmon || Mount Lemmon Survey || FLO || align=right data-sort-value="0.67" | 670 m || 
|-id=734 bgcolor=#fefefe
| 308734 ||  || — || April 25, 2006 || Kitt Peak || Spacewatch || — || align=right data-sort-value="0.82" | 820 m || 
|-id=735 bgcolor=#fefefe
| 308735 ||  || — || April 27, 2006 || Kitt Peak || Spacewatch || — || align=right | 1.1 km || 
|-id=736 bgcolor=#fefefe
| 308736 ||  || — || April 21, 2006 || Catalina || CSS || — || align=right | 1.8 km || 
|-id=737 bgcolor=#fefefe
| 308737 ||  || — || April 30, 2006 || Kitt Peak || Spacewatch || NYS || align=right data-sort-value="0.61" | 610 m || 
|-id=738 bgcolor=#E9E9E9
| 308738 ||  || — || April 30, 2006 || Kitt Peak || Spacewatch || — || align=right data-sort-value="0.88" | 880 m || 
|-id=739 bgcolor=#fefefe
| 308739 ||  || — || April 25, 2006 || Kitt Peak || Spacewatch || V || align=right data-sort-value="0.79" | 790 m || 
|-id=740 bgcolor=#fefefe
| 308740 ||  || — || May 1, 2006 || Socorro || LINEAR || MAS || align=right data-sort-value="0.78" | 780 m || 
|-id=741 bgcolor=#fefefe
| 308741 ||  || — || May 1, 2006 || Kitt Peak || Spacewatch || NYS || align=right data-sort-value="0.78" | 780 m || 
|-id=742 bgcolor=#E9E9E9
| 308742 ||  || — || May 4, 2006 || Siding Spring || SSS || — || align=right | 1.5 km || 
|-id=743 bgcolor=#fefefe
| 308743 ||  || — || May 3, 2006 || Mount Lemmon || Mount Lemmon Survey || NYS || align=right data-sort-value="0.74" | 740 m || 
|-id=744 bgcolor=#fefefe
| 308744 ||  || — || May 5, 2006 || Kitt Peak || Spacewatch || — || align=right data-sort-value="0.97" | 970 m || 
|-id=745 bgcolor=#fefefe
| 308745 ||  || — || May 5, 2006 || Kitt Peak || Spacewatch || V || align=right data-sort-value="0.93" | 930 m || 
|-id=746 bgcolor=#fefefe
| 308746 ||  || — || May 5, 2006 || Mount Lemmon || Mount Lemmon Survey || — || align=right | 1.0 km || 
|-id=747 bgcolor=#fefefe
| 308747 ||  || — || May 6, 2006 || Mount Lemmon || Mount Lemmon Survey || — || align=right | 1.1 km || 
|-id=748 bgcolor=#E9E9E9
| 308748 ||  || — || May 6, 2006 || Mount Lemmon || Mount Lemmon Survey || — || align=right | 1.9 km || 
|-id=749 bgcolor=#fefefe
| 308749 ||  || — || May 8, 2006 || Mount Lemmon || Mount Lemmon Survey || V || align=right data-sort-value="0.71" | 710 m || 
|-id=750 bgcolor=#fefefe
| 308750 ||  || — || May 1, 2006 || Kitt Peak || Spacewatch || — || align=right | 1.0 km || 
|-id=751 bgcolor=#fefefe
| 308751 ||  || — || May 2, 2006 || Mount Lemmon || Mount Lemmon Survey || — || align=right data-sort-value="0.94" | 940 m || 
|-id=752 bgcolor=#fefefe
| 308752 ||  || — || May 6, 2006 || Mount Lemmon || Mount Lemmon Survey || V || align=right data-sort-value="0.89" | 890 m || 
|-id=753 bgcolor=#fefefe
| 308753 ||  || — || May 1, 2006 || Mauna Kea || P. A. Wiegert || MAS || align=right data-sort-value="0.78" | 780 m || 
|-id=754 bgcolor=#fefefe
| 308754 ||  || — || May 19, 2006 || Mount Lemmon || Mount Lemmon Survey || — || align=right | 1.3 km || 
|-id=755 bgcolor=#fefefe
| 308755 ||  || — || May 20, 2006 || Kitt Peak || Spacewatch || — || align=right data-sort-value="0.88" | 880 m || 
|-id=756 bgcolor=#fefefe
| 308756 ||  || — || May 20, 2006 || Kitt Peak || Spacewatch || V || align=right data-sort-value="0.74" | 740 m || 
|-id=757 bgcolor=#E9E9E9
| 308757 ||  || — || May 18, 2006 || Palomar || NEAT || — || align=right | 2.2 km || 
|-id=758 bgcolor=#fefefe
| 308758 ||  || — || May 20, 2006 || Mount Lemmon || Mount Lemmon Survey || — || align=right data-sort-value="0.95" | 950 m || 
|-id=759 bgcolor=#E9E9E9
| 308759 ||  || — || May 21, 2006 || Kitt Peak || Spacewatch || — || align=right | 1.1 km || 
|-id=760 bgcolor=#fefefe
| 308760 ||  || — || May 22, 2006 || Kitt Peak || Spacewatch || — || align=right | 1.0 km || 
|-id=761 bgcolor=#E9E9E9
| 308761 ||  || — || May 23, 2006 || Mount Lemmon || Mount Lemmon Survey || JUN || align=right | 3.2 km || 
|-id=762 bgcolor=#E9E9E9
| 308762 ||  || — || May 27, 2006 || Kitt Peak || Spacewatch || MIT || align=right | 2.7 km || 
|-id=763 bgcolor=#fefefe
| 308763 ||  || — || May 31, 2006 || Mount Lemmon || Mount Lemmon Survey || MAS || align=right data-sort-value="0.78" | 780 m || 
|-id=764 bgcolor=#E9E9E9
| 308764 ||  || — || June 9, 2006 || Palomar || NEAT || — || align=right | 1.6 km || 
|-id=765 bgcolor=#E9E9E9
| 308765 ||  || — || July 19, 2006 || Hibiscus || S. F. Hönig || — || align=right | 1.3 km || 
|-id=766 bgcolor=#E9E9E9
| 308766 ||  || — || July 21, 2006 || Mount Lemmon || Mount Lemmon Survey || — || align=right | 2.7 km || 
|-id=767 bgcolor=#fefefe
| 308767 ||  || — || July 20, 2006 || Palomar || NEAT || PHO || align=right | 1.2 km || 
|-id=768 bgcolor=#E9E9E9
| 308768 ||  || — || July 24, 2006 || Hibiscus || S. F. Hönig || — || align=right | 1.9 km || 
|-id=769 bgcolor=#d6d6d6
| 308769 ||  || — || July 20, 2006 || Palomar || NEAT || EUP || align=right | 7.5 km || 
|-id=770 bgcolor=#E9E9E9
| 308770 ||  || — || July 21, 2006 || Catalina || CSS || — || align=right | 2.9 km || 
|-id=771 bgcolor=#FA8072
| 308771 ||  || — || July 21, 2006 || Catalina || CSS || — || align=right data-sort-value="0.75" | 750 m || 
|-id=772 bgcolor=#E9E9E9
| 308772 ||  || — || August 13, 2006 || Palomar || NEAT || — || align=right | 2.0 km || 
|-id=773 bgcolor=#E9E9E9
| 308773 ||  || — || August 12, 2006 || Palomar || NEAT || EUN || align=right | 1.5 km || 
|-id=774 bgcolor=#E9E9E9
| 308774 ||  || — || August 15, 2006 || Palomar || NEAT || EUN || align=right | 1.7 km || 
|-id=775 bgcolor=#E9E9E9
| 308775 ||  || — || August 14, 2006 || Siding Spring || SSS || — || align=right | 2.5 km || 
|-id=776 bgcolor=#E9E9E9
| 308776 ||  || — || August 15, 2006 || Palomar || NEAT || — || align=right | 3.4 km || 
|-id=777 bgcolor=#E9E9E9
| 308777 ||  || — || August 12, 2006 || Palomar || NEAT || — || align=right | 2.5 km || 
|-id=778 bgcolor=#E9E9E9
| 308778 ||  || — || August 12, 2006 || Palomar || NEAT || — || align=right | 4.6 km || 
|-id=779 bgcolor=#E9E9E9
| 308779 ||  || — || August 14, 2006 || Siding Spring || SSS || — || align=right | 2.1 km || 
|-id=780 bgcolor=#E9E9E9
| 308780 ||  || — || August 13, 2006 || Siding Spring || SSS || — || align=right | 1.7 km || 
|-id=781 bgcolor=#E9E9E9
| 308781 ||  || — || August 15, 2006 || Siding Spring || SSS || — || align=right | 2.7 km || 
|-id=782 bgcolor=#E9E9E9
| 308782 ||  || — || August 12, 2006 || Palomar || NEAT || — || align=right | 2.8 km || 
|-id=783 bgcolor=#fefefe
| 308783 ||  || — || August 18, 2006 || Socorro || LINEAR || — || align=right | 1.3 km || 
|-id=784 bgcolor=#fefefe
| 308784 ||  || — || August 18, 2006 || Socorro || LINEAR || — || align=right | 1.3 km || 
|-id=785 bgcolor=#E9E9E9
| 308785 ||  || — || August 18, 2006 || Anderson Mesa || LONEOS || JUN || align=right | 1.6 km || 
|-id=786 bgcolor=#E9E9E9
| 308786 ||  || — || August 19, 2006 || Kitt Peak || Spacewatch || — || align=right | 1.9 km || 
|-id=787 bgcolor=#E9E9E9
| 308787 ||  || — || August 17, 2006 || Palomar || NEAT || — || align=right | 2.7 km || 
|-id=788 bgcolor=#E9E9E9
| 308788 ||  || — || August 19, 2006 || Kitt Peak || Spacewatch || — || align=right | 1.7 km || 
|-id=789 bgcolor=#E9E9E9
| 308789 ||  || — || August 19, 2006 || Kitt Peak || Spacewatch || — || align=right | 2.3 km || 
|-id=790 bgcolor=#E9E9E9
| 308790 ||  || — || August 21, 2006 || Kitt Peak || Spacewatch || — || align=right | 2.0 km || 
|-id=791 bgcolor=#E9E9E9
| 308791 ||  || — || August 17, 2006 || Palomar || NEAT || — || align=right | 2.9 km || 
|-id=792 bgcolor=#E9E9E9
| 308792 ||  || — || August 19, 2006 || Reedy Creek || J. Broughton || — || align=right | 2.9 km || 
|-id=793 bgcolor=#E9E9E9
| 308793 ||  || — || August 20, 2006 || Palomar || NEAT || — || align=right | 2.2 km || 
|-id=794 bgcolor=#E9E9E9
| 308794 ||  || — || August 21, 2006 || Palomar || NEAT || TIN || align=right | 1.4 km || 
|-id=795 bgcolor=#fefefe
| 308795 ||  || — || August 22, 2006 || Palomar || NEAT || NYS || align=right data-sort-value="0.76" | 760 m || 
|-id=796 bgcolor=#E9E9E9
| 308796 ||  || — || August 23, 2006 || Palomar || NEAT || — || align=right | 2.3 km || 
|-id=797 bgcolor=#E9E9E9
| 308797 ||  || — || August 24, 2006 || Palomar || NEAT || — || align=right | 1.9 km || 
|-id=798 bgcolor=#E9E9E9
| 308798 Teo ||  ||  || August 26, 2006 || La Cañada || J. Lacruz || — || align=right | 3.0 km || 
|-id=799 bgcolor=#E9E9E9
| 308799 ||  || — || August 19, 2006 || Palomar || NEAT || — || align=right | 4.1 km || 
|-id=800 bgcolor=#E9E9E9
| 308800 ||  || — || August 19, 2006 || Palomar || NEAT || — || align=right | 2.9 km || 
|}

308801–308900 

|-bgcolor=#E9E9E9
| 308801 ||  || — || August 22, 2006 || Palomar || NEAT || INO || align=right | 1.5 km || 
|-id=802 bgcolor=#E9E9E9
| 308802 ||  || — || August 24, 2006 || Palomar || NEAT || — || align=right | 3.3 km || 
|-id=803 bgcolor=#E9E9E9
| 308803 ||  || — || August 27, 2006 || Kitt Peak || Spacewatch || — || align=right | 3.9 km || 
|-id=804 bgcolor=#E9E9E9
| 308804 ||  || — || August 27, 2006 || Kitt Peak || Spacewatch || — || align=right | 2.2 km || 
|-id=805 bgcolor=#E9E9E9
| 308805 ||  || — || August 27, 2006 || Kitt Peak || Spacewatch || — || align=right | 1.6 km || 
|-id=806 bgcolor=#E9E9E9
| 308806 ||  || — || August 22, 2006 || Palomar || NEAT || — || align=right | 2.7 km || 
|-id=807 bgcolor=#E9E9E9
| 308807 ||  || — || August 19, 2006 || Kitt Peak || Spacewatch || — || align=right | 1.6 km || 
|-id=808 bgcolor=#E9E9E9
| 308808 ||  || — || August 27, 2006 || Kitt Peak || Spacewatch || — || align=right | 2.2 km || 
|-id=809 bgcolor=#E9E9E9
| 308809 ||  || — || August 24, 2006 || Socorro || LINEAR || — || align=right | 3.1 km || 
|-id=810 bgcolor=#E9E9E9
| 308810 ||  || — || August 27, 2006 || Anderson Mesa || LONEOS || — || align=right | 3.5 km || 
|-id=811 bgcolor=#E9E9E9
| 308811 ||  || — || August 27, 2006 || Anderson Mesa || LONEOS || — || align=right | 3.4 km || 
|-id=812 bgcolor=#E9E9E9
| 308812 ||  || — || August 28, 2006 || Catalina || CSS || MRX || align=right | 1.1 km || 
|-id=813 bgcolor=#fefefe
| 308813 ||  || — || August 29, 2006 || Anderson Mesa || LONEOS || — || align=right | 1.3 km || 
|-id=814 bgcolor=#E9E9E9
| 308814 ||  || — || August 16, 2006 || Palomar || NEAT || — || align=right | 2.3 km || 
|-id=815 bgcolor=#E9E9E9
| 308815 ||  || — || August 18, 2006 || Kitt Peak || Spacewatch || — || align=right | 3.7 km || 
|-id=816 bgcolor=#E9E9E9
| 308816 ||  || — || August 18, 2006 || Kitt Peak || Spacewatch || — || align=right | 1.7 km || 
|-id=817 bgcolor=#E9E9E9
| 308817 ||  || — || August 19, 2006 || Kitt Peak || Spacewatch || — || align=right | 1.3 km || 
|-id=818 bgcolor=#E9E9E9
| 308818 ||  || — || August 29, 2006 || Kitt Peak || Spacewatch || — || align=right | 2.3 km || 
|-id=819 bgcolor=#d6d6d6
| 308819 ||  || — || August 29, 2006 || Anderson Mesa || LONEOS || — || align=right | 6.2 km || 
|-id=820 bgcolor=#E9E9E9
| 308820 ||  || — || August 29, 2006 || Anderson Mesa || LONEOS || — || align=right | 1.8 km || 
|-id=821 bgcolor=#E9E9E9
| 308821 ||  || — || August 29, 2006 || Anderson Mesa || LONEOS || — || align=right | 2.2 km || 
|-id=822 bgcolor=#E9E9E9
| 308822 ||  || — || August 26, 2006 || Siding Spring || SSS || — || align=right | 2.3 km || 
|-id=823 bgcolor=#E9E9E9
| 308823 ||  || — || August 20, 2006 || Kitt Peak || Spacewatch || — || align=right | 2.8 km || 
|-id=824 bgcolor=#E9E9E9
| 308824 ||  || — || August 18, 2006 || Palomar || NEAT || — || align=right | 2.6 km || 
|-id=825 bgcolor=#E9E9E9
| 308825 Siksika ||  ||  || September 14, 2006 || Mauna Kea || D. D. Balam || — || align=right | 3.7 km || 
|-id=826 bgcolor=#E9E9E9
| 308826 ||  || — || September 14, 2006 || Catalina || CSS || — || align=right | 3.1 km || 
|-id=827 bgcolor=#E9E9E9
| 308827 ||  || — || September 14, 2006 || Catalina || CSS || — || align=right | 2.2 km || 
|-id=828 bgcolor=#E9E9E9
| 308828 ||  || — || September 12, 2006 || Catalina || CSS || MRX || align=right | 1.2 km || 
|-id=829 bgcolor=#E9E9E9
| 308829 ||  || — || September 14, 2006 || Palomar || NEAT || — || align=right | 2.9 km || 
|-id=830 bgcolor=#d6d6d6
| 308830 ||  || — || September 15, 2006 || Kitt Peak || Spacewatch || K-2 || align=right | 2.2 km || 
|-id=831 bgcolor=#E9E9E9
| 308831 ||  || — || September 15, 2006 || Kitt Peak || Spacewatch || — || align=right | 3.1 km || 
|-id=832 bgcolor=#E9E9E9
| 308832 ||  || — || September 14, 2006 || Kitt Peak || Spacewatch || — || align=right | 1.1 km || 
|-id=833 bgcolor=#E9E9E9
| 308833 ||  || — || September 15, 2006 || Socorro || LINEAR || DOR || align=right | 3.5 km || 
|-id=834 bgcolor=#E9E9E9
| 308834 ||  || — || September 14, 2006 || Palomar || NEAT || — || align=right | 2.8 km || 
|-id=835 bgcolor=#E9E9E9
| 308835 ||  || — || September 14, 2006 || Catalina || CSS || — || align=right | 2.5 km || 
|-id=836 bgcolor=#E9E9E9
| 308836 ||  || — || September 14, 2006 || Palomar || NEAT || — || align=right | 3.5 km || 
|-id=837 bgcolor=#d6d6d6
| 308837 ||  || — || September 14, 2006 || Kitt Peak || Spacewatch || — || align=right | 2.2 km || 
|-id=838 bgcolor=#E9E9E9
| 308838 ||  || — || September 14, 2006 || Kitt Peak || Spacewatch || — || align=right | 2.4 km || 
|-id=839 bgcolor=#fefefe
| 308839 ||  || — || September 14, 2006 || Kitt Peak || Spacewatch || SUL || align=right | 2.3 km || 
|-id=840 bgcolor=#E9E9E9
| 308840 ||  || — || September 14, 2006 || Kitt Peak || Spacewatch || AST || align=right | 3.0 km || 
|-id=841 bgcolor=#E9E9E9
| 308841 ||  || — || September 14, 2006 || Kitt Peak || Spacewatch || MRX || align=right | 1.1 km || 
|-id=842 bgcolor=#E9E9E9
| 308842 ||  || — || September 15, 2006 || Kitt Peak || Spacewatch || — || align=right | 1.7 km || 
|-id=843 bgcolor=#E9E9E9
| 308843 ||  || — || September 14, 2006 || Palomar || NEAT || — || align=right | 2.5 km || 
|-id=844 bgcolor=#E9E9E9
| 308844 ||  || — || September 12, 2006 || Catalina || CSS || — || align=right | 1.8 km || 
|-id=845 bgcolor=#fefefe
| 308845 ||  || — || September 12, 2006 || Catalina || CSS || — || align=right | 1.1 km || 
|-id=846 bgcolor=#E9E9E9
| 308846 ||  || — || September 15, 2006 || Kitt Peak || Spacewatch || — || align=right | 2.3 km || 
|-id=847 bgcolor=#E9E9E9
| 308847 ||  || — || September 15, 2006 || Kitt Peak || Spacewatch || — || align=right | 1.5 km || 
|-id=848 bgcolor=#E9E9E9
| 308848 ||  || — || September 15, 2006 || Kitt Peak || Spacewatch || WIT || align=right | 1.3 km || 
|-id=849 bgcolor=#E9E9E9
| 308849 ||  || — || September 15, 2006 || Kitt Peak || Spacewatch || — || align=right | 1.9 km || 
|-id=850 bgcolor=#E9E9E9
| 308850 ||  || — || September 15, 2006 || Kitt Peak || Spacewatch || HOF || align=right | 2.6 km || 
|-id=851 bgcolor=#E9E9E9
| 308851 ||  || — || September 15, 2006 || Kitt Peak || Spacewatch || AGN || align=right | 1.4 km || 
|-id=852 bgcolor=#E9E9E9
| 308852 ||  || — || September 15, 2006 || Kitt Peak || Spacewatch || AGN || align=right | 1.4 km || 
|-id=853 bgcolor=#E9E9E9
| 308853 ||  || — || September 15, 2006 || Kitt Peak || Spacewatch || MRX || align=right | 1.5 km || 
|-id=854 bgcolor=#E9E9E9
| 308854 ||  || — || September 1, 2006 || Črni Vrh || Črni Vrh || — || align=right | 3.4 km || 
|-id=855 bgcolor=#E9E9E9
| 308855 ||  || — || September 11, 2006 || Apache Point || A. C. Becker || — || align=right | 2.7 km || 
|-id=856 bgcolor=#E9E9E9
| 308856 Daniket ||  ||  || September 14, 2006 || Mauna Kea || J. Masiero || GEF || align=right data-sort-value="0.94" | 940 m || 
|-id=857 bgcolor=#E9E9E9
| 308857 ||  || — || September 14, 2006 || Mauna Kea || J. Masiero || — || align=right | 2.1 km || 
|-id=858 bgcolor=#E9E9E9
| 308858 ||  || — || September 14, 2006 || Kitt Peak || Spacewatch || HOF || align=right | 2.7 km || 
|-id=859 bgcolor=#E9E9E9
| 308859 ||  || — || September 16, 2006 || Kitt Peak || Spacewatch || — || align=right | 3.1 km || 
|-id=860 bgcolor=#d6d6d6
| 308860 ||  || — || September 16, 2006 || Kitt Peak || Spacewatch || — || align=right | 3.1 km || 
|-id=861 bgcolor=#E9E9E9
| 308861 ||  || — || September 16, 2006 || Palomar || NEAT || GEF || align=right | 1.4 km || 
|-id=862 bgcolor=#E9E9E9
| 308862 ||  || — || September 16, 2006 || Palomar || NEAT || RAF || align=right | 1.2 km || 
|-id=863 bgcolor=#E9E9E9
| 308863 ||  || — || September 17, 2006 || Catalina || CSS || — || align=right | 1.6 km || 
|-id=864 bgcolor=#E9E9E9
| 308864 ||  || — || September 17, 2006 || Catalina || CSS || DOR || align=right | 3.5 km || 
|-id=865 bgcolor=#E9E9E9
| 308865 ||  || — || September 17, 2006 || Catalina || CSS || MRX || align=right | 1.2 km || 
|-id=866 bgcolor=#d6d6d6
| 308866 ||  || — || September 17, 2006 || Catalina || CSS || HYG || align=right | 4.6 km || 
|-id=867 bgcolor=#E9E9E9
| 308867 ||  || — || September 17, 2006 || Anderson Mesa || LONEOS || GEF || align=right | 1.7 km || 
|-id=868 bgcolor=#d6d6d6
| 308868 ||  || — || September 16, 2006 || Catalina || CSS || — || align=right | 4.8 km || 
|-id=869 bgcolor=#E9E9E9
| 308869 ||  || — || September 17, 2006 || Kitt Peak || Spacewatch || — || align=right | 2.2 km || 
|-id=870 bgcolor=#E9E9E9
| 308870 ||  || — || September 17, 2006 || Anderson Mesa || LONEOS || DOR || align=right | 2.5 km || 
|-id=871 bgcolor=#E9E9E9
| 308871 ||  || — || September 18, 2006 || Kitt Peak || Spacewatch || — || align=right | 2.7 km || 
|-id=872 bgcolor=#E9E9E9
| 308872 ||  || — || September 18, 2006 || Anderson Mesa || LONEOS || MRX || align=right | 1.6 km || 
|-id=873 bgcolor=#d6d6d6
| 308873 ||  || — || September 18, 2006 || Catalina || CSS || — || align=right | 2.5 km || 
|-id=874 bgcolor=#E9E9E9
| 308874 ||  || — || September 16, 2006 || Catalina || CSS || GEF || align=right | 1.7 km || 
|-id=875 bgcolor=#E9E9E9
| 308875 ||  || — || September 19, 2006 || Kitt Peak || Spacewatch || — || align=right | 2.7 km || 
|-id=876 bgcolor=#E9E9E9
| 308876 ||  || — || September 19, 2006 || Kitt Peak || Spacewatch || GEF || align=right | 1.1 km || 
|-id=877 bgcolor=#d6d6d6
| 308877 ||  || — || September 19, 2006 || Kitt Peak || Spacewatch || K-2 || align=right | 1.6 km || 
|-id=878 bgcolor=#E9E9E9
| 308878 ||  || — || September 23, 2006 || Piszkéstető || K. Sárneczky, Z. Kuli || — || align=right | 2.2 km || 
|-id=879 bgcolor=#E9E9E9
| 308879 ||  || — || September 16, 2006 || Catalina || CSS || — || align=right | 3.1 km || 
|-id=880 bgcolor=#E9E9E9
| 308880 ||  || — || September 18, 2006 || Kitt Peak || Spacewatch || WIT || align=right | 1.1 km || 
|-id=881 bgcolor=#E9E9E9
| 308881 ||  || — || September 18, 2006 || Kitt Peak || Spacewatch || HOF || align=right | 2.5 km || 
|-id=882 bgcolor=#E9E9E9
| 308882 ||  || — || September 18, 2006 || Kitt Peak || Spacewatch || — || align=right | 3.2 km || 
|-id=883 bgcolor=#E9E9E9
| 308883 ||  || — || September 19, 2006 || Kitt Peak || Spacewatch || — || align=right | 1.2 km || 
|-id=884 bgcolor=#E9E9E9
| 308884 ||  || — || September 20, 2006 || Kitt Peak || Spacewatch || — || align=right | 2.9 km || 
|-id=885 bgcolor=#E9E9E9
| 308885 ||  || — || September 17, 2006 || Catalina || CSS || MRX || align=right | 1.1 km || 
|-id=886 bgcolor=#E9E9E9
| 308886 ||  || — || September 21, 2006 || Anderson Mesa || LONEOS || MAR || align=right | 1.4 km || 
|-id=887 bgcolor=#E9E9E9
| 308887 ||  || — || September 24, 2006 || Anderson Mesa || LONEOS || — || align=right | 2.0 km || 
|-id=888 bgcolor=#d6d6d6
| 308888 ||  || — || September 19, 2006 || Kitt Peak || Spacewatch || KAR || align=right | 1.1 km || 
|-id=889 bgcolor=#d6d6d6
| 308889 ||  || — || September 19, 2006 || Kitt Peak || Spacewatch || KAR || align=right | 1.1 km || 
|-id=890 bgcolor=#E9E9E9
| 308890 ||  || — || September 19, 2006 || Kitt Peak || Spacewatch || — || align=right | 1.9 km || 
|-id=891 bgcolor=#E9E9E9
| 308891 ||  || — || September 23, 2006 || Kitt Peak || Spacewatch || — || align=right | 2.5 km || 
|-id=892 bgcolor=#E9E9E9
| 308892 ||  || — || August 21, 2001 || Kitt Peak || Spacewatch || HEN || align=right | 1.3 km || 
|-id=893 bgcolor=#E9E9E9
| 308893 ||  || — || September 25, 2006 || Kitt Peak || Spacewatch || EUN || align=right | 1.9 km || 
|-id=894 bgcolor=#E9E9E9
| 308894 ||  || — || September 25, 2006 || Kitt Peak || Spacewatch || WIT || align=right data-sort-value="0.92" | 920 m || 
|-id=895 bgcolor=#E9E9E9
| 308895 ||  || — || September 25, 2006 || Kitt Peak || Spacewatch || — || align=right | 1.2 km || 
|-id=896 bgcolor=#E9E9E9
| 308896 ||  || — || September 25, 2006 || Mount Lemmon || Mount Lemmon Survey || — || align=right | 2.0 km || 
|-id=897 bgcolor=#E9E9E9
| 308897 ||  || — || September 25, 2006 || Mount Lemmon || Mount Lemmon Survey || AST || align=right | 1.4 km || 
|-id=898 bgcolor=#d6d6d6
| 308898 ||  || — || September 25, 2006 || Mount Lemmon || Mount Lemmon Survey || KOR || align=right | 1.4 km || 
|-id=899 bgcolor=#FFC2E0
| 308899 ||  || — || September 29, 2006 || Socorro || LINEAR || AMO || align=right data-sort-value="0.77" | 770 m || 
|-id=900 bgcolor=#E9E9E9
| 308900 ||  || — || September 24, 2006 || Kitt Peak || Spacewatch || — || align=right | 2.2 km || 
|}

308901–309000 

|-bgcolor=#E9E9E9
| 308901 ||  || — || September 25, 2006 || Mount Lemmon || Mount Lemmon Survey || WIT || align=right data-sort-value="0.97" | 970 m || 
|-id=902 bgcolor=#E9E9E9
| 308902 ||  || — || September 25, 2006 || Mount Lemmon || Mount Lemmon Survey || AST || align=right | 2.0 km || 
|-id=903 bgcolor=#E9E9E9
| 308903 ||  || — || September 26, 2006 || Kitt Peak || Spacewatch || — || align=right | 2.0 km || 
|-id=904 bgcolor=#E9E9E9
| 308904 ||  || — || September 26, 2006 || Kitt Peak || Spacewatch || — || align=right | 2.2 km || 
|-id=905 bgcolor=#E9E9E9
| 308905 ||  || — || September 26, 2006 || Kitt Peak || Spacewatch || MRX || align=right | 1.2 km || 
|-id=906 bgcolor=#E9E9E9
| 308906 ||  || — || September 26, 2006 || Kitt Peak || Spacewatch || AGN || align=right | 1.2 km || 
|-id=907 bgcolor=#E9E9E9
| 308907 ||  || — || August 28, 2006 || Kitt Peak || Spacewatch || — || align=right | 1.6 km || 
|-id=908 bgcolor=#E9E9E9
| 308908 ||  || — || September 26, 2006 || Mount Lemmon || Mount Lemmon Survey || AST || align=right | 1.6 km || 
|-id=909 bgcolor=#E9E9E9
| 308909 ||  || — || September 26, 2006 || Mount Lemmon || Mount Lemmon Survey || — || align=right | 2.7 km || 
|-id=910 bgcolor=#E9E9E9
| 308910 ||  || — || September 26, 2006 || Kitt Peak || Spacewatch || — || align=right data-sort-value="0.87" | 870 m || 
|-id=911 bgcolor=#d6d6d6
| 308911 ||  || — || September 26, 2006 || Kitt Peak || Spacewatch || — || align=right | 2.9 km || 
|-id=912 bgcolor=#d6d6d6
| 308912 ||  || — || September 26, 2006 || Kitt Peak || Spacewatch || CHA || align=right | 1.8 km || 
|-id=913 bgcolor=#d6d6d6
| 308913 ||  || — || September 27, 2006 || Mount Lemmon || Mount Lemmon Survey || — || align=right | 2.3 km || 
|-id=914 bgcolor=#E9E9E9
| 308914 ||  || — || September 19, 2006 || Catalina || CSS || EUN || align=right | 1.7 km || 
|-id=915 bgcolor=#E9E9E9
| 308915 ||  || — || September 16, 2006 || Siding Spring || SSS || — || align=right | 3.1 km || 
|-id=916 bgcolor=#d6d6d6
| 308916 ||  || — || September 27, 2006 || Catalina || CSS || Tj (2.91) || align=right | 5.3 km || 
|-id=917 bgcolor=#E9E9E9
| 308917 ||  || — || September 25, 2006 || Kitt Peak || Spacewatch || — || align=right | 1.9 km || 
|-id=918 bgcolor=#E9E9E9
| 308918 ||  || — || September 27, 2006 || Kitt Peak || Spacewatch || AGN || align=right | 1.6 km || 
|-id=919 bgcolor=#E9E9E9
| 308919 ||  || — || September 27, 2006 || Kitt Peak || Spacewatch || HEN || align=right data-sort-value="0.98" | 980 m || 
|-id=920 bgcolor=#E9E9E9
| 308920 ||  || — || September 27, 2006 || Kitt Peak || Spacewatch || WIT || align=right | 1.3 km || 
|-id=921 bgcolor=#E9E9E9
| 308921 ||  || — || September 27, 2006 || Kitt Peak || Spacewatch || HOF || align=right | 2.7 km || 
|-id=922 bgcolor=#E9E9E9
| 308922 ||  || — || September 27, 2006 || Kitt Peak || Spacewatch || — || align=right | 2.2 km || 
|-id=923 bgcolor=#E9E9E9
| 308923 ||  || — || September 27, 2006 || Kitt Peak || Spacewatch || AST || align=right | 1.7 km || 
|-id=924 bgcolor=#E9E9E9
| 308924 ||  || — || September 28, 2006 || Kitt Peak || Spacewatch || AST || align=right | 1.7 km || 
|-id=925 bgcolor=#E9E9E9
| 308925 ||  || — || September 28, 2006 || Kitt Peak || Spacewatch || HOF || align=right | 2.3 km || 
|-id=926 bgcolor=#E9E9E9
| 308926 ||  || — || September 28, 2006 || Kitt Peak || Spacewatch || — || align=right | 2.2 km || 
|-id=927 bgcolor=#E9E9E9
| 308927 ||  || — || September 28, 2006 || Kitt Peak || Spacewatch || HOF || align=right | 2.6 km || 
|-id=928 bgcolor=#E9E9E9
| 308928 ||  || — || September 29, 2006 || Socorro || LINEAR || — || align=right | 2.9 km || 
|-id=929 bgcolor=#E9E9E9
| 308929 ||  || — || September 30, 2006 || Catalina || CSS || — || align=right | 2.9 km || 
|-id=930 bgcolor=#E9E9E9
| 308930 ||  || — || September 30, 2006 || Catalina || CSS || — || align=right | 2.8 km || 
|-id=931 bgcolor=#E9E9E9
| 308931 ||  || — || September 30, 2006 || Mount Lemmon || Mount Lemmon Survey || PAD || align=right | 1.7 km || 
|-id=932 bgcolor=#E9E9E9
| 308932 ||  || — || September 26, 2006 || Catalina || CSS || — || align=right | 3.7 km || 
|-id=933 bgcolor=#C2E0FF
| 308933 ||  || — || September 27, 2006 || Apache Point || A. C. Becker, A. W. Puckett, J. Kubica || centaurcritical || align=right | 122 km || 
|-id=934 bgcolor=#E9E9E9
| 308934 ||  || — || September 25, 2006 || Moletai || Molėtai Obs. || — || align=right | 2.8 km || 
|-id=935 bgcolor=#E9E9E9
| 308935 ||  || — || September 29, 2006 || Apache Point || A. C. Becker || MRX || align=right | 1.4 km || 
|-id=936 bgcolor=#E9E9E9
| 308936 ||  || — || September 18, 2006 || Kitt Peak || Spacewatch || — || align=right | 2.3 km || 
|-id=937 bgcolor=#fefefe
| 308937 ||  || — || September 28, 2006 || Mount Lemmon || Mount Lemmon Survey || — || align=right | 1.2 km || 
|-id=938 bgcolor=#E9E9E9
| 308938 ||  || — || September 17, 2006 || Mauna Kea || J. Masiero || JUN || align=right data-sort-value="0.95" | 950 m || 
|-id=939 bgcolor=#d6d6d6
| 308939 ||  || — || September 25, 2006 || Kitt Peak || Spacewatch || CHA || align=right | 1.8 km || 
|-id=940 bgcolor=#E9E9E9
| 308940 ||  || — || September 25, 2006 || Kitt Peak || Spacewatch || — || align=right | 2.3 km || 
|-id=941 bgcolor=#d6d6d6
| 308941 ||  || — || September 19, 2006 || Kitt Peak || Spacewatch || KOR || align=right | 1.3 km || 
|-id=942 bgcolor=#E9E9E9
| 308942 ||  || — || September 18, 2006 || Anderson Mesa || LONEOS || GEF || align=right | 1.5 km || 
|-id=943 bgcolor=#d6d6d6
| 308943 ||  || — || September 27, 2006 || Mount Lemmon || Mount Lemmon Survey || — || align=right | 2.8 km || 
|-id=944 bgcolor=#d6d6d6
| 308944 ||  || — || September 29, 2006 || Anderson Mesa || LONEOS || — || align=right | 3.5 km || 
|-id=945 bgcolor=#E9E9E9
| 308945 ||  || — || October 1, 2006 || Kitt Peak || Spacewatch || — || align=right | 1.9 km || 
|-id=946 bgcolor=#d6d6d6
| 308946 ||  || — || October 15, 2006 || Piszkéstető || K. Sárneczky, Z. Kuli || CHA || align=right | 1.9 km || 
|-id=947 bgcolor=#E9E9E9
| 308947 ||  || — || October 10, 2006 || Palomar || NEAT || — || align=right | 2.8 km || 
|-id=948 bgcolor=#E9E9E9
| 308948 ||  || — || October 10, 2006 || Palomar || NEAT || AEO || align=right | 1.5 km || 
|-id=949 bgcolor=#d6d6d6
| 308949 ||  || — || September 19, 2006 || Kitt Peak || Spacewatch || KOR || align=right | 1.5 km || 
|-id=950 bgcolor=#E9E9E9
| 308950 ||  || — || October 11, 2006 || Kitt Peak || Spacewatch || AGN || align=right | 1.5 km || 
|-id=951 bgcolor=#fefefe
| 308951 ||  || — || October 11, 2006 || Kitt Peak || Spacewatch || NYS || align=right data-sort-value="0.93" | 930 m || 
|-id=952 bgcolor=#E9E9E9
| 308952 ||  || — || October 12, 2006 || Kitt Peak || Spacewatch || AGN || align=right | 1.5 km || 
|-id=953 bgcolor=#d6d6d6
| 308953 ||  || — || October 12, 2006 || Kitt Peak || Spacewatch || EOS || align=right | 1.9 km || 
|-id=954 bgcolor=#d6d6d6
| 308954 ||  || — || October 12, 2006 || Kitt Peak || Spacewatch || — || align=right | 3.3 km || 
|-id=955 bgcolor=#E9E9E9
| 308955 ||  || — || October 12, 2006 || Kitt Peak || Spacewatch || — || align=right | 1.6 km || 
|-id=956 bgcolor=#fefefe
| 308956 ||  || — || October 12, 2006 || Kitt Peak || Spacewatch || — || align=right | 1.1 km || 
|-id=957 bgcolor=#d6d6d6
| 308957 ||  || — || October 12, 2006 || Kitt Peak || Spacewatch || — || align=right | 2.5 km || 
|-id=958 bgcolor=#E9E9E9
| 308958 ||  || — || October 12, 2006 || Kitt Peak || Spacewatch || GEF || align=right | 1.7 km || 
|-id=959 bgcolor=#E9E9E9
| 308959 ||  || — || October 12, 2006 || Kitt Peak || Spacewatch || — || align=right | 2.6 km || 
|-id=960 bgcolor=#d6d6d6
| 308960 ||  || — || October 12, 2006 || Kitt Peak || Spacewatch || CHA || align=right | 2.3 km || 
|-id=961 bgcolor=#E9E9E9
| 308961 ||  || — || October 12, 2006 || Kitt Peak || Spacewatch || — || align=right | 1.5 km || 
|-id=962 bgcolor=#d6d6d6
| 308962 ||  || — || October 12, 2006 || Kitt Peak || Spacewatch || KOR || align=right | 1.4 km || 
|-id=963 bgcolor=#d6d6d6
| 308963 ||  || — || October 15, 2006 || Catalina || CSS || — || align=right | 2.1 km || 
|-id=964 bgcolor=#fefefe
| 308964 ||  || — || October 11, 2006 || Palomar || NEAT || — || align=right | 1.1 km || 
|-id=965 bgcolor=#E9E9E9
| 308965 ||  || — || October 11, 2006 || Palomar || NEAT || INO || align=right | 1.7 km || 
|-id=966 bgcolor=#E9E9E9
| 308966 ||  || — || October 11, 2006 || Palomar || NEAT || — || align=right | 3.0 km || 
|-id=967 bgcolor=#E9E9E9
| 308967 ||  || — || October 11, 2006 || Kitt Peak || Spacewatch || XIZ || align=right | 1.6 km || 
|-id=968 bgcolor=#E9E9E9
| 308968 ||  || — || October 11, 2006 || Palomar || NEAT || — || align=right | 3.2 km || 
|-id=969 bgcolor=#E9E9E9
| 308969 ||  || — || October 11, 2006 || Palomar || NEAT || — || align=right | 3.3 km || 
|-id=970 bgcolor=#E9E9E9
| 308970 ||  || — || October 13, 2006 || Kitt Peak || Spacewatch || — || align=right | 2.1 km || 
|-id=971 bgcolor=#d6d6d6
| 308971 ||  || — || October 12, 2006 || Palomar || NEAT || — || align=right | 4.2 km || 
|-id=972 bgcolor=#d6d6d6
| 308972 ||  || — || November 20, 2001 || Socorro || LINEAR || — || align=right | 2.7 km || 
|-id=973 bgcolor=#d6d6d6
| 308973 ||  || — || October 15, 2006 || Kitt Peak || Spacewatch || — || align=right | 2.4 km || 
|-id=974 bgcolor=#E9E9E9
| 308974 ||  || — || October 15, 2006 || Kitt Peak || Spacewatch || AGN || align=right | 1.2 km || 
|-id=975 bgcolor=#E9E9E9
| 308975 ||  || — || October 15, 2006 || Kitt Peak || Spacewatch || — || align=right | 3.0 km || 
|-id=976 bgcolor=#fefefe
| 308976 ||  || — || October 15, 2006 || Kitt Peak || Spacewatch || — || align=right data-sort-value="0.73" | 730 m || 
|-id=977 bgcolor=#E9E9E9
| 308977 ||  || — || October 15, 2006 || Kitt Peak || Spacewatch || — || align=right | 3.0 km || 
|-id=978 bgcolor=#d6d6d6
| 308978 ||  || — || October 1, 2006 || Apache Point || A. C. Becker || — || align=right | 2.9 km || 
|-id=979 bgcolor=#E9E9E9
| 308979 ||  || — || October 3, 2006 || Apache Point || A. C. Becker || — || align=right | 2.6 km || 
|-id=980 bgcolor=#d6d6d6
| 308980 ||  || — || October 3, 2006 || Apache Point || A. C. Becker || NAE || align=right | 2.5 km || 
|-id=981 bgcolor=#d6d6d6
| 308981 ||  || — || October 1, 2006 || Kitt Peak || Spacewatch || EOS || align=right | 2.6 km || 
|-id=982 bgcolor=#d6d6d6
| 308982 ||  || — || October 2, 2006 || Mount Lemmon || Mount Lemmon Survey || — || align=right | 3.0 km || 
|-id=983 bgcolor=#d6d6d6
| 308983 ||  || — || October 2, 2006 || Mount Lemmon || Mount Lemmon Survey || — || align=right | 3.7 km || 
|-id=984 bgcolor=#d6d6d6
| 308984 ||  || — || October 2, 2006 || Kitt Peak || Spacewatch || — || align=right | 3.5 km || 
|-id=985 bgcolor=#d6d6d6
| 308985 ||  || — || October 16, 2006 || Altschwendt || W. Ries || KAR || align=right | 1.5 km || 
|-id=986 bgcolor=#d6d6d6
| 308986 ||  || — || September 26, 2006 || Mount Lemmon || Mount Lemmon Survey || EOS || align=right | 2.2 km || 
|-id=987 bgcolor=#d6d6d6
| 308987 ||  || — || October 17, 2006 || Mount Lemmon || Mount Lemmon Survey || — || align=right | 2.5 km || 
|-id=988 bgcolor=#d6d6d6
| 308988 ||  || — || October 17, 2006 || Mount Lemmon || Mount Lemmon Survey || KOR || align=right | 1.4 km || 
|-id=989 bgcolor=#d6d6d6
| 308989 ||  || — || October 17, 2006 || Mount Lemmon || Mount Lemmon Survey || — || align=right | 3.0 km || 
|-id=990 bgcolor=#E9E9E9
| 308990 ||  || — || October 16, 2006 || Kitt Peak || Spacewatch || HOF || align=right | 3.3 km || 
|-id=991 bgcolor=#E9E9E9
| 308991 ||  || — || October 3, 2006 || Kitt Peak || Spacewatch || MRX || align=right | 1.4 km || 
|-id=992 bgcolor=#d6d6d6
| 308992 ||  || — || October 16, 2006 || Kitt Peak || Spacewatch || — || align=right | 3.8 km || 
|-id=993 bgcolor=#d6d6d6
| 308993 ||  || — || October 16, 2006 || Kitt Peak || Spacewatch || KOR || align=right | 1.5 km || 
|-id=994 bgcolor=#d6d6d6
| 308994 ||  || — || October 16, 2006 || Kitt Peak || Spacewatch || — || align=right | 2.2 km || 
|-id=995 bgcolor=#d6d6d6
| 308995 ||  || — || October 16, 2006 || Kitt Peak || Spacewatch || KAR || align=right | 1.1 km || 
|-id=996 bgcolor=#d6d6d6
| 308996 ||  || — || October 16, 2006 || Kitt Peak || Spacewatch || fast? || align=right | 3.5 km || 
|-id=997 bgcolor=#d6d6d6
| 308997 ||  || — || October 16, 2006 || Kitt Peak || Spacewatch || — || align=right | 2.7 km || 
|-id=998 bgcolor=#d6d6d6
| 308998 ||  || — || October 16, 2006 || Kitt Peak || Spacewatch || — || align=right | 2.9 km || 
|-id=999 bgcolor=#E9E9E9
| 308999 ||  || — || October 16, 2006 || Kitt Peak || Spacewatch || — || align=right | 2.2 km || 
|-id=000 bgcolor=#E9E9E9
| 309000 ||  || — || October 16, 2006 || Kitt Peak || Spacewatch || — || align=right data-sort-value="0.96" | 960 m || 
|}

References

External links 
 Discovery Circumstances: Numbered Minor Planets (305001)–(310000) (IAU Minor Planet Center)

0308